This is a partial list of unnumbered minor planets for principal provisional designations assigned during 16–31 October 2003. Since this period yielded a high number of provisional discoveries, it is further split into several standalone pages. , a total of 482 bodies remain unnumbered for this period. Objects for this year are listed on the following pages: A–E · F–G · H–L · M–R · Si · Sii · Siii · Siv · T · Ui · Uii · Uiii · Uiv · V · Wi · Wii and X–Y. Also see previous and next year.

U 

|- id="2003 UA" bgcolor=#fefefe
| 1 || 2003 UA || HUN || 18.2 || data-sort-value="0.68" | 680 m || multiple || 2003–2020 || 25 Jan 2020 || 150 || align=left | Alt.: 2011 UJ33 || 
|- id="2003 UC" bgcolor=#FA8072
| – || 2003 UC || MCA || 20.3 || data-sort-value="0.26" | 260 m || single || 1 day || 17 Oct 2003 || 17 || align=left | — || 
|- id="2003 UE" bgcolor=#FFC2E0
| 0 || 2003 UE || AMO || 20.32 || data-sort-value="0.31" | 310 m || multiple || 2003–2021 || 29 Nov 2021 || 149 || align=left | — || 
|- id="2003 UF" bgcolor=#E9E9E9
| 0 || 2003 UF || MBA-M || 17.8 || 1.2 km || multiple || 2003–2020 || 12 Dec 2020 || 173 || align=left | — || 
|- id="2003 UK" bgcolor=#E9E9E9
| 0 || 2003 UK || MBA-M || 17.5 || data-sort-value="0.94" | 940 m || multiple || 2003–2021 || 17 Jan 2021 || 84 || align=left | Alt.: 2007 RN35 || 
|- id="2003 UM" bgcolor=#FA8072
| 1 || 2003 UM || MCA || 18.4 || data-sort-value="0.62" | 620 m || multiple || 2003–2020 || 22 Jun 2020 || 145 || align=left | — || 
|- id="2003 UD1" bgcolor=#fefefe
| 0 ||  || MBA-I || 18.67 || data-sort-value="0.55" | 550 m || multiple || 2003–2021 || 28 Nov 2021 || 118 || align=left | Alt.: 2014 XQ16 || 
|- id="2003 UF1" bgcolor=#fefefe
| 0 ||  || MBA-I || 18.26 || data-sort-value="0.66" | 660 m || multiple || 2003–2021 || 27 Nov 2021 || 123 || align=left | Alt.: 2014 WK119 || 
|- id="2003 UV1" bgcolor=#E9E9E9
| 3 ||  || MBA-M || 19.0 || data-sort-value="0.67" | 670 m || multiple || 2003–2020 || 08 Nov 2020 || 21 || align=left | Disc.:  LPL/Spacewatch IIAdded on 17 June 2021 || 
|- id="2003 UE2" bgcolor=#d6d6d6
| 1 ||  || MBA-O || 18.4 || 1.2 km || multiple || 2003–2019 || 03 Dec 2019 || 41 || align=left | — || 
|- id="2003 UK2" bgcolor=#E9E9E9
| 0 ||  || MBA-M || 17.7 || 1.2 km || multiple || 2003–2020 || 03 Nov 2020 || 62 || align=left | Disc.: LPL/Spacewatch IIAdded on 17 January 2021 || 
|- id="2003 UL2" bgcolor=#fefefe
| 0 ||  || MBA-I || 19.03 || data-sort-value="0.46" | 460 m || multiple || 2003–2022 || 06 Jan 2022 || 55 || align=left | Alt.: 2017 QP53 || 
|- id="2003 UP2" bgcolor=#E9E9E9
| 0 ||  || MBA-M || 17.68 || 1.6 km || multiple || 2003–2021 || 08 Nov 2021 || 85 || align=left | Disc.: SpacewatchAdded on 21 August 2021 || 
|- id="2003 UY2" bgcolor=#d6d6d6
| 0 ||  || MBA-O || 16.5 || 2.8 km || multiple || 2003–2021 || 01 Feb 2021 || 104 || align=left | Alt.: 2010 FZ104 || 
|- id="2003 UG3" bgcolor=#d6d6d6
| 1 ||  || MBA-O || 18.0 || 1.4 km || multiple || 2003–2021 || 03 Jan 2021 || 45 || align=left | Alt.: 2014 SP167 || 
|- id="2003 UM3" bgcolor=#FFC2E0
| 9 ||  || APO || 28.1 || data-sort-value="0.0085" | 9 m || single || 1 day || 18 Oct 2003 || 12 || align=left | — || 
|- id="2003 UQ3" bgcolor=#FFC2E0
| 0 ||  || AMO || 19.6 || data-sort-value="0.43" | 430 m || multiple || 2003–2020 || 07 Dec 2020 || 140 || align=left | — || 
|- id="2003 UT3" bgcolor=#FA8072
| 1 ||  || MCA || 18.8 || data-sort-value="0.52" | 520 m || multiple || 2003–2020 || 10 Sep 2020 || 109 || align=left | Alt.: 2010 OO95 || 
|- id="2003 UA4" bgcolor=#fefefe
| 1 ||  || MBA-I || 19.0 || data-sort-value="0.47" | 470 m || multiple || 2003–2018 || 11 Nov 2018 || 34 || align=left | — || 
|- id="2003 UB5" bgcolor=#FFC2E0
| 0 ||  || AMO || 19.59 || data-sort-value="0.43" | 430 m || multiple || 2003–2021 || 17 Apr 2021 || 345 || align=left | — || 
|- id="2003 UC5" bgcolor=#FFC2E0
| 0 ||  || APO || 20.35 || data-sort-value="0.30" | 300 m || multiple || 2003–2021 || 07 Nov 2021 || 99 || align=left | — || 
|- id="2003 UD5" bgcolor=#FFC2E0
| 1 ||  || AMO || 23.3 || data-sort-value="0.078" | 78 m || single || 33 days || 20 Nov 2003 || 110 || align=left | — || 
|- id="2003 UJ5" bgcolor=#E9E9E9
| 1 ||  || MBA-M || 18.25 || 1.2 km || multiple || 2003–2021 || 16 Jul 2021 || 57 || align=left | — || 
|- id="2003 UL5" bgcolor=#fefefe
| 2 ||  || HUN || 19.9 || data-sort-value="0.31" | 310 m || multiple || 2003–2018 || 17 May 2018 || 21 || align=left | — || 
|- id="2003 UQ5" bgcolor=#E9E9E9
| 3 ||  || MBA-M || 17.5 || 1.8 km || multiple || 2003–2014 || 05 Mar 2014 || 32 || align=left | Alt.: 2014 EL75 || 
|- id="2003 UR5" bgcolor=#FA8072
| 2 ||  || MCA || 19.3 || data-sort-value="0.58" | 580 m || multiple || 2003–2020 || 15 Dec 2020 || 77 || align=left | — || 
|- id="2003 UW5" bgcolor=#FFC2E0
| 6 ||  || AMO || 24.3 || data-sort-value="0.049" | 49 m || single || 44 days || 01 Dec 2003 || 53 || align=left | — || 
|- id="2003 UX5" bgcolor=#FFC2E0
| 0 ||  || APO || 20.29 || data-sort-value="0.31" | 310 m || multiple || 2003–2023 || 19 Mar 2023 || 276 || align=left | Potentially hazardous object || 
|- id="2003 UD6" bgcolor=#E9E9E9
| 2 ||  || MBA-M || 17.9 || 1.1 km || multiple || 2003–2019 || 28 May 2019 || 25 || align=left | — || 
|- id="2003 UE6" bgcolor=#fefefe
| 0 ||  || HUN || 20.12 || data-sort-value="0.28" | 280 m || multiple || 2003–2021 || 27 Jun 2021 || 22 || align=left | Disc.: SpacewatchAdded on 22 July 2020 || 
|- id="2003 UM6" bgcolor=#E9E9E9
| 2 ||  || MBA-M || 17.7 || data-sort-value="0.86" | 860 m || multiple || 2003–2019 || 08 Jun 2019 || 51 || align=left | — || 
|- id="2003 UO6" bgcolor=#d6d6d6
| 0 ||  || MBA-O || 15.9 || 3.7 km || multiple || 2003–2021 || 15 Jan 2021 || 117 || align=left | Alt.: 2014 UT221 || 
|- id="2003 UU6" bgcolor=#E9E9E9
| 0 ||  || MBA-M || 17.31 || 1.5 km || multiple || 2003–2022 || 10 Jan 2022 || 215 || align=left | — || 
|- id="2003 UG7" bgcolor=#FA8072
| 1 ||  || MCA || 16.9 || 1.2 km || multiple || 2003–2021 || 03 Jan 2021 || 79 || align=left | — || 
|- id="2003 UY7" bgcolor=#FA8072
| 0 ||  || HUN || 19.0 || data-sort-value="0.47" | 470 m || multiple || 2003–2020 || 08 Nov 2020 || 94 || align=left | — || 
|- id="2003 UZ7" bgcolor=#FA8072
| 2 ||  || MCA || 20.9 || data-sort-value="0.28" | 280 m || multiple || 2003–2016 || 02 Nov 2016 || 33 || align=left | Alt.: 2016 TG18 || 
|- id="2003 UB8" bgcolor=#fefefe
| 1 ||  || HUN || 19.0 || data-sort-value="0.47" | 470 m || multiple || 2003–2019 || 01 Nov 2019 || 80 || align=left | — || 
|- id="2003 UC8" bgcolor=#fefefe
| 0 ||  || MBA-I || 18.5 || data-sort-value="0.59" | 590 m || multiple || 2002–2020 || 05 Nov 2020 || 104 || align=left | Alt.: 2002 GH140 || 
|- id="2003 UE8" bgcolor=#FFC2E0
| 6 ||  || AMO || 24.9 || data-sort-value="0.037" | 37 m || single || 43 days || 30 Nov 2003 || 36 || align=left | — || 
|- id="2003 UF8" bgcolor=#E9E9E9
| 1 ||  || MBA-M || 18.4 || data-sort-value="0.88" | 880 m || multiple || 2003–2021 || 07 Jan 2021 || 73 || align=left | — || 
|- id="2003 UE9" bgcolor=#fefefe
| 1 ||  || MBA-I || 18.1 || data-sort-value="0.71" | 710 m || multiple || 2003–2020 || 04 Dec 2020 || 157 || align=left | Alt.: 2015 FA391 || 
|- id="2003 UL9" bgcolor=#FFC2E0
| 7 ||  || APO || 22.4 || data-sort-value="0.12" | 120 m || single || 6 days || 25 Oct 2003 || 24 || align=left | — || 
|- id="2003 UR9" bgcolor=#d6d6d6
| 0 ||  || MBA-O || 16.7 || 2.5 km || multiple || 2002–2021 || 06 Jan 2021 || 127 || align=left | — || 
|- id="2003 US9" bgcolor=#FA8072
| 1 ||  || MCA || 18.5 || data-sort-value="0.59" | 590 m || multiple || 2003–2016 || 13 Mar 2016 || 82 || align=left | — || 
|- id="2003 UC10" bgcolor=#FFC2E0
| 8 ||  || APO || 23.9 || data-sort-value="0.059" | 59 m || single || 13 days || 02 Nov 2003 || 29 || align=left | — || 
|- id="2003 UJ10" bgcolor=#E9E9E9
| 1 ||  || MBA-M || 17.3 || 1.0 km || multiple || 2003–2021 || 16 Jan 2021 || 51 || align=left | — || 
|- id="2003 UK10" bgcolor=#E9E9E9
| 0 ||  || MBA-M || 17.11 || 2.1 km || multiple || 2003–2021 || 08 Dec 2021 || 177 || align=left | Alt.: 2012 VR36 || 
|- id="2003 UM10" bgcolor=#d6d6d6
| 0 ||  || MBA-O || 17.0 || 2.2 km || multiple || 2003–2019 || 07 Jul 2019 || 114 || align=left | Alt.: 2014 SA286 || 
|- id="2003 UQ10" bgcolor=#E9E9E9
| 0 ||  || MBA-M || 17.1 || 1.6 km || multiple || 2003–2021 || 15 Jan 2021 || 156 || align=left | — || 
|- id="2003 UU10" bgcolor=#fefefe
| 0 ||  || MBA-I || 18.1 || data-sort-value="0.71" | 710 m || multiple || 2003–2021 || 09 Jan 2021 || 210 || align=left | — || 
|- id="2003 UP11" bgcolor=#FA8072
| 0 ||  || MCA || 18.0 || data-sort-value="0.75" | 750 m || multiple || 2003–2020 || 05 Dec 2020 || 164 || align=left | — || 
|- id="2003 UC12" bgcolor=#fefefe
| 0 ||  || MBA-I || 17.5 || data-sort-value="0.94" | 940 m || multiple || 2003–2020 || 19 Apr 2020 || 231 || align=left | Alt.: 2012 BX100 || 
|- id="2003 UO12" bgcolor=#FFC2E0
| 0 ||  || APO || 23.9 || data-sort-value="0.059" | 59 m || multiple || 2003–2018 || 20 Feb 2018 || 195 || align=left | Alt.: 2018 AX11 || 
|- id="2003 UP12" bgcolor=#FFC2E0
| 7 ||  || APO || 25.5 || data-sort-value="0.028" | 28 m || single || 5 days || 26 Oct 2003 || 37 || align=left | — || 
|- id="2003 UQ12" bgcolor=#FFC2E0
| 7 ||  || APO || 24.9 || data-sort-value="0.037" | 37 m || single || 9 days || 30 Oct 2003 || 40 || align=left | — || 
|- id="2003 UW12" bgcolor=#d6d6d6
| 0 ||  || MBA-O || 16.37 || 3.0 km || multiple || 2003–2021 || 07 Apr 2021 || 239 || align=left | — || 
|- id="2003 UY12" bgcolor=#FFC2E0
| 1 ||  || ATE || 22.9 || data-sort-value="0.093" | 93 m || multiple || 2003–2016 || 13 Nov 2016 || 84 || align=left | Alt.: 2003 US12, 2013 UT8 || 
|- id="2003 UB13" bgcolor=#FA8072
| 1 ||  || MCA || 17.5 || 1.3 km || multiple || 2003–2020 || 02 May 2020 || 76 || align=left | — || 
|- id="2003 UC13" bgcolor=#E9E9E9
| 0 ||  || MBA-M || 17.90 || 1.1 km || multiple || 2003–2022 || 27 Jan 2022 || 62 || align=left | — || 
|- id="2003 UA14" bgcolor=#fefefe
| 0 ||  || HUN || 19.04 || data-sort-value="0.46" | 460 m || multiple || 2003–2021 || 29 Aug 2021 || 63 || align=left | — || 
|- id="2003 UZ14" bgcolor=#d6d6d6
| – ||  || MBA-O || 18.5 || 1.1 km || single || 8 days || 24 Oct 2003 || 13 || align=left | — || 
|- id="2003 UL15" bgcolor=#d6d6d6
| – ||  || MBA-O || 17.9 || 1.5 km || single || 51 days || 19 Nov 2003 || 34 || align=left | — || 
|- id="2003 UV15" bgcolor=#FA8072
| 2 ||  || MCA || 18.3 || data-sort-value="0.65" | 650 m || multiple || 2003–2011 || 01 Aug 2011 || 49 || align=left | — || 
|- id="2003 UX15" bgcolor=#E9E9E9
| 1 ||  || MBA-M || 17.9 || data-sort-value="0.78" | 780 m || multiple || 1995–2019 || 29 Nov 2019 || 129 || align=left | — || 
|- id="2003 UC16" bgcolor=#FA8072
| 1 ||  || MCA || 17.8 || data-sort-value="0.82" | 820 m || multiple || 2003–2018 || 31 Dec 2018 || 172 || align=left | — || 
|- id="2003 UA17" bgcolor=#d6d6d6
| 2 ||  || MBA-O || 17.7 || 1.6 km || multiple || 2003–2020 || 15 Oct 2020 || 32 || align=left | Disc.: SpacewatchAdded on 17 January 2021 || 
|- id="2003 UC17" bgcolor=#E9E9E9
| 3 ||  || MBA-M || 18.3 || data-sort-value="0.65" | 650 m || multiple || 2003–2019 || 17 Nov 2019 || 27 || align=left | — || 
|- id="2003 UQ17" bgcolor=#d6d6d6
| 2 ||  || MBA-O || 18.2 || 1.3 km || multiple || 2003–2019 || 24 Oct 2019 || 31 || align=left | Disc.: SpacewatchAdded on 22 July 2020Alt.: 2014 VH29 || 
|- id="2003 US17" bgcolor=#d6d6d6
| 0 ||  || MBA-O || 17.0 || 2.2 km || multiple || 2003–2021 || 09 Jan 2021 || 37 || align=left | Disc.: SpacewatchAdded on 22 July 2020 || 
|- id="2003 UT17" bgcolor=#d6d6d6
| 0 ||  || MBA-O || 17.5 || 1.8 km || multiple || 2003–2019 || 25 Aug 2019 || 48 || align=left | — || 
|- id="2003 UC18" bgcolor=#fefefe
| 0 ||  || MBA-I || 18.63 || data-sort-value="0.56" | 560 m || multiple || 2003–2021 || 31 Oct 2021 || 139 || align=left | Alt.: 2014 WW212 || 
|- id="2003 UH18" bgcolor=#fefefe
| 0 ||  || MBA-I || 17.9 || data-sort-value="0.78" | 780 m || multiple || 2003–2020 || 02 Apr 2020 || 118 || align=left | Alt.: 2016 CS156 || 
|- id="2003 UK18" bgcolor=#fefefe
| 0 ||  || MBA-I || 19.4 || data-sort-value="0.39" | 390 m || multiple || 2003–2020 || 23 Nov 2020 || 40 || align=left | Disc.: SpacewatchAdded on 17 January 2021 || 
|- id="2003 UU18" bgcolor=#E9E9E9
| 1 ||  || MBA-M || 18.87 || data-sort-value="0.71" | 710 m || multiple || 2003–2021 || 12 Dec 2021 || 38 || align=left | — || 
|- id="2003 UW18" bgcolor=#E9E9E9
| 1 ||  || MBA-M || 17.9 || 1.5 km || multiple || 2001–2017 || 25 Oct 2017 || 37 || align=left | — || 
|- id="2003 UX18" bgcolor=#fefefe
| – ||  || MBA-I || 19.4 || data-sort-value="0.39" | 390 m || single || 3 days || 23 Oct 2003 || 11 || align=left | — || 
|- id="2003 UX19" bgcolor=#E9E9E9
| 2 ||  || MBA-M || 17.7 || 1.2 km || multiple || 2003–2019 || 05 Jul 2019 || 65 || align=left | Alt.: 2019 NS2 || 
|- id="2003 UY19" bgcolor=#FFC2E0
| 1 ||  || AMO || 18.6 || data-sort-value="0.68" | 680 m || multiple || 2003–2008 || 16 Jan 2008 || 122 || align=left | — || 
|- id="2003 UR20" bgcolor=#E9E9E9
| 0 ||  || MBA-M || 16.5 || 2.8 km || multiple || 2003–2019 || 08 Feb 2019 || 109 || align=left | — || 
|- id="2003 UT20" bgcolor=#fefefe
| 1 ||  || HUN || 18.5 || data-sort-value="0.59" | 590 m || multiple || 1995–2019 || 31 Dec 2019 || 117 || align=left | — || 
|- id="2003 UA21" bgcolor=#FA8072
| 3 ||  || MCA || 19.0 || data-sort-value="0.88" | 880 m || multiple || 2003–2017 || 17 Nov 2017 || 32 || align=left | — || 
|- id="2003 UD21" bgcolor=#E9E9E9
| 1 ||  || MBA-M || 17.4 || data-sort-value="0.98" | 980 m || multiple || 1999–2019 || 27 Jun 2019 || 44 || align=left | — || 
|- id="2003 UF21" bgcolor=#E9E9E9
| 0 ||  || MBA-M || 17.6 || 1.3 km || multiple || 2003–2020 || 07 Dec 2020 || 120 || align=left | — || 
|- id="2003 UJ21" bgcolor=#d6d6d6
| 0 ||  || MBA-O || 17.1 || 2.1 km || multiple || 2003–2021 || 10 Jan 2021 || 92 || align=left | Alt.: 2014 WV85, 2016 CF119 || 
|- id="2003 UB22" bgcolor=#FFC2E0
| 8 ||  || APO || 24.3 || data-sort-value="0.049" | 49 m || single || 7 days || 28 Oct 2003 || 35 || align=left | — || 
|- id="2003 UC22" bgcolor=#FFC2E0
| 5 ||  || AMO || 22.1 || data-sort-value="0.14" | 140 m || single || 39 days || 30 Nov 2003 || 41 || align=left | — || 
|- id="2003 UE22" bgcolor=#FFC2E0
| 7 ||  || AMO || 24.7 || data-sort-value="0.041" | 41 m || single || 13 days || 05 Nov 2003 || 47 || align=left | — || 
|- id="2003 UG22" bgcolor=#FFC2E0
| 1 ||  || APO || 21.2 || data-sort-value="0.20" | 200 m || multiple || 2003–2020 || 22 Nov 2020 || 162 || align=left | — || 
|- id="2003 UL22" bgcolor=#E9E9E9
| 1 ||  || MBA-M || 18.4 || 1.2 km || multiple || 2003–2021 || 09 Sep 2021 || 54 || align=left | Alt.: 2021 PB64 || 
|- id="2003 UM22" bgcolor=#d6d6d6
| 1 ||  || MBA-O || 17.18 || 2.0 km || multiple || 2003–2021 || 27 Nov 2021 || 30 || align=left | — || 
|- id="2003 UY23" bgcolor=#fefefe
| 0 ||  || MBA-I || 18.13 || data-sort-value="0.70" | 700 m || multiple || 2003–2021 || 14 Apr 2021 || 132 || align=left | — || 
|- id="2003 UP24" bgcolor=#FFC2E0
| 1 ||  || AMO || 20.1 || data-sort-value="0.34" | 340 m || multiple || 2003–2013 || 08 Nov 2013 || 95 || align=left | — || 
|- id="2003 US24" bgcolor=#fefefe
| E ||  || MBA-I || 20.1 || data-sort-value="0.28" | 280 m || single || 1 day || 25 Oct 2003 || 9 || align=left | — || 
|- id="2003 UT24" bgcolor=#FA8072
| – ||  || MCA || 20.2 || data-sort-value="0.27" | 270 m || single || 20 days || 25 Oct 2003 || 23 || align=left | — || 
|- id="2003 UU24" bgcolor=#fefefe
| 0 ||  || MBA-I || 18.4 || data-sort-value="0.62" | 620 m || multiple || 2003–2020 || 05 Nov 2020 || 69 || align=left | — || 
|- id="2003 UO25" bgcolor=#FFC2E0
| 4 ||  || APO || 22.6 || data-sort-value="0.11" | 110 m || multiple || 2003–2005 || 28 Oct 2005 || 54 || align=left | — || 
|- id="2003 UP25" bgcolor=#FFC2E0
| 2 ||  || AMO || 23.3 || data-sort-value="0.078" | 78 m || single || 12 days || 05 Nov 2003 || 56 || align=left | — || 
|- id="2003 UQ25" bgcolor=#FFC2E0
| 7 ||  || APO || 24.1 || data-sort-value="0.054" | 54 m || single || 11 days || 04 Nov 2003 || 57 || align=left | — || 
|- id="2003 UR25" bgcolor=#FFC2E0
| 8 ||  || APO || 25.5 || data-sort-value="0.028" | 28 m || single || 0 day || 25 Oct 2003 || 18 || align=left | — || 
|- id="2003 US25" bgcolor=#FA8072
| 0 ||  || MCA || 17.53 || data-sort-value="0.93" | 930 m || multiple || 2003–2021 || 23 Apr 2021 || 161 || align=left | — || 
|- id="2003 UZ25" bgcolor=#fefefe
| 0 ||  || HUN || 19.25 || data-sort-value="0.42" | 420 m || multiple || 2003–2021 || 09 Nov 2021 || 57 || align=left | — || 
|- id="2003 UW26" bgcolor=#FFC2E0
| 0 ||  || AMO || 19.18 || data-sort-value="0.52" | 520 m || multiple || 2003–2021 || 01 Dec 2021 || 156 || align=left | — || 
|- id="2003 UX26" bgcolor=#FFC2E0
| 7 ||  || APO || 24.5 || data-sort-value="0.045" | 45 m || single || 8 days || 01 Nov 2003 || 68 || align=left | — || 
|- id="2003 UZ26" bgcolor=#d6d6d6
| 0 ||  || MBA-O || 16.6 || 2.7 km || multiple || 2003–2020 || 16 Nov 2020 || 60 || align=left | Disc.: LPL/Spacewatch IIAdded on 17 January 2021Alt.: 2010 CK207 || 
|- id="2003 UY27" bgcolor=#FA8072
| 0 ||  || MCA || 17.7 || 1.2 km || multiple || 2003–2021 || 12 Jan 2021 || 381 || align=left | Alt.: 2003 XB || 
|- id="2003 UE28" bgcolor=#fefefe
| 0 ||  || MBA-I || 18.02 || data-sort-value="0.74" | 740 m || multiple || 2003–2022 || 27 Jan 2022 || 162 || align=left | — || 
|- id="2003 UZ28" bgcolor=#fefefe
| 0 ||  || MBA-I || 18.91 || data-sort-value="0.49" | 490 m || multiple || 2003–2022 || 05 Jan 2022 || 72 || align=left | — || 
|- id="2003 UY29" bgcolor=#d6d6d6
| 0 ||  || MBA-O || 16.2 || 3.2 km || multiple || 2003–2020 || 23 Nov 2020 || 173 || align=left | Alt.: 2014 UL11 || 
|- id="2003 UE30" bgcolor=#E9E9E9
| 2 ||  || MBA-M || 17.9 || data-sort-value="0.78" | 780 m || multiple || 2003–2015 || 10 Sep 2015 || 21 || align=left | Disc.: SpacewatchAdded on 29 January 2022 || 
|- id="2003 UO30" bgcolor=#fefefe
| 2 ||  || MBA-I || 18.9 || data-sort-value="0.49" | 490 m || multiple || 2003–2018 || 16 Sep 2018 || 24 || align=left | — || 
|- id="2003 UX30" bgcolor=#fefefe
| 2 ||  || MBA-I || 19.2 || data-sort-value="0.43" | 430 m || multiple || 2003–2020 || 05 Nov 2020 || 42 || align=left | Disc.: SpacewatchAdded on 17 January 2021 || 
|- id="2003 UB31" bgcolor=#E9E9E9
| 0 ||  || MBA-M || 18.00 || 1.4 km || multiple || 2003–2021 || 11 Sep 2021 || 35 || align=left | Disc.: SpacewatchAdded on 21 August 2021 || 
|- id="2003 UD31" bgcolor=#fefefe
| 0 ||  || MBA-I || 19.1 || data-sort-value="0.45" | 450 m || multiple || 2003–2021 || 08 Jun 2021 || 30 || align=left | — || 
|- id="2003 UE31" bgcolor=#d6d6d6
| 0 ||  || MBA-O || 16.5 || 2.8 km || multiple || 2003–2020 || 05 Nov 2020 || 83 || align=left | Disc.: SpacewatchAdded on 30 September 2021Alt.: 2014 TM107 || 
|- id="2003 UF31" bgcolor=#E9E9E9
| 1 ||  || MBA-M || 18.62 || 1.1 km || multiple || 2003–2021 || 06 Nov 2021 || 45 || align=left | Disc.: SpacewatchAdded on 5 November 2021Alt.: 2012 VX10, 2021 RV78 || 
|- id="2003 UK31" bgcolor=#fefefe
| 0 ||  || MBA-I || 18.3 || data-sort-value="0.65" | 650 m || multiple || 2003–2020 || 15 Jul 2020 || 65 || align=left | — || 
|- id="2003 UM31" bgcolor=#d6d6d6
| 2 ||  || MBA-O || 18.0 || 1.4 km || multiple || 2003–2019 || 27 Sep 2019 || 21 || align=left | Disc.: SpacewatchAdded on 21 August 2021 || 
|- id="2003 UQ31" bgcolor=#E9E9E9
| 0 ||  || MBA-M || 17.88 || 1.1 km || multiple || 2003–2021 || 08 Dec 2021 || 77 || align=left | Alt.: 2012 UJ58 || 
|- id="2003 UA32" bgcolor=#fefefe
| 0 ||  || HUN || 19.00 || data-sort-value="0.47" | 470 m || multiple || 2003–2021 || 30 Oct 2021 || 92 || align=left | Alt.: 2015 FF318, 2016 WB20 || 
|- id="2003 UB32" bgcolor=#fefefe
| 1 ||  || MBA-I || 18.1 || data-sort-value="0.71" | 710 m || multiple || 2003–2018 || 14 Aug 2018 || 53 || align=left | Alt.: 2007 UN76 || 
|- id="2003 UN32" bgcolor=#d6d6d6
| 1 ||  || HIL || 16.2 || 3.2 km || multiple || 2003–2020 || 28 Jan 2020 || 73 || align=left | — || 
|- id="2003 UP32" bgcolor=#d6d6d6
| 2 ||  || MBA-O || 17.6 || 1.7 km || multiple || 2003–2019 || 19 Nov 2019 || 40 || align=left | Alt.: 2019 TU31 || 
|- id="2003 UX32" bgcolor=#E9E9E9
| 0 ||  || MBA-M || 18.55 || data-sort-value="0.82" | 820 m || multiple || 2003–2022 || 07 Jan 2022 || 31 || align=left | — || 
|- id="2003 UE33" bgcolor=#fefefe
| 0 ||  || MBA-I || 18.4 || data-sort-value="0.62" | 620 m || multiple || 2003–2021 || 11 Jun 2021 || 71 || align=left | Alt.: 2014 OW378 || 
|- id="2003 UK33" bgcolor=#E9E9E9
| 0 ||  || MBA-M || 17.49 || 1.8 km || multiple || 2003–2021 || 09 Sep 2021 || 40 || align=left | Disc.: LPL/Spacewatch IIAdded on 21 August 2021 || 
|- id="2003 US33" bgcolor=#E9E9E9
| 0 ||  || MBA-M || 17.0 || 2.2 km || multiple || 2003–2020 || 16 May 2020 || 81 || align=left | Alt.: 2015 FP272 || 
|- id="2003 UU33" bgcolor=#E9E9E9
| 0 ||  || MBA-M || 18.29 || 1.2 km || multiple || 2003–2021 || 04 Oct 2021 || 43 || align=left | — || 
|- id="2003 UV33" bgcolor=#fefefe
| 0 ||  || MBA-I || 18.1 || data-sort-value="0.71" | 710 m || multiple || 2003–2021 || 18 Jan 2021 || 77 || align=left | Alt.: 2013 WL51, 2016 TQ13 || 
|- id="2003 UY33" bgcolor=#fefefe
| 2 ||  || MBA-I || 19.1 || data-sort-value="0.45" | 450 m || multiple || 2003–2020 || 23 Jan 2020 || 42 || align=left | Alt.: 2006 QO147 || 
|- id="2003 UA34" bgcolor=#E9E9E9
| 0 ||  || MBA-M || 17.3 || 1.0 km || multiple || 2003–2021 || 18 Jan 2021 || 81 || align=left | Alt.: 2013 BJ20 || 
|- id="2003 UB34" bgcolor=#d6d6d6
| 0 ||  || MBA-O || 16.8 || 2.4 km || multiple || 1992–2021 || 16 Jan 2021 || 92 || align=left | Alt.: 2014 WT304 || 
|- id="2003 UC34" bgcolor=#d6d6d6
| 0 ||  || MBA-O || 16.4 || 2.9 km || multiple || 2003–2020 || 20 Nov 2020 || 60 || align=left | Alt.: 2010 DA98, 2010 DA99 || 
|- id="2003 UD34" bgcolor=#d6d6d6
| 0 ||  || MBA-O || 17.35 || 1.9 km || multiple || 2000–2019 || 11 Jan 2019 || 51 || align=left | Alt.: 2008 UR136 || 
|- id="2003 UG34" bgcolor=#E9E9E9
| 0 ||  || MBA-M || 16.98 || 2.2 km || multiple || 1998–2021 || 12 Sep 2021 || 213 || align=left | Alt.: 2010 KQ4 || 
|- id="2003 UP35" bgcolor=#E9E9E9
| 0 ||  || MBA-M || 18.3 || data-sort-value="0.92" | 920 m || multiple || 2003–2021 || 11 Jan 2021 || 109 || align=left | — || 
|- id="2003 UF36" bgcolor=#d6d6d6
| 0 ||  || MBA-O || 16.20 || 3.2 km || multiple || 2003–2021 || 06 Apr 2021 || 112 || align=left | Alt.: 2004 YX22 || 
|- id="2003 UW36" bgcolor=#FA8072
| 0 ||  || MCA || 18.5 || data-sort-value="0.59" | 590 m || multiple || 2003–2019 || 31 Oct 2019 || 159 || align=left | Alt.: 2006 QV139 || 
|- id="2003 UH38" bgcolor=#fefefe
| 0 ||  || MBA-I || 18.12 || data-sort-value="0.71" | 710 m || multiple || 2003–2021 || 26 Nov 2021 || 34 || align=left | Disc.: LPL/Spacewatch IIAdded on 5 November 2021 || 
|- id="2003 UX38" bgcolor=#fefefe
| 0 ||  || MBA-I || 18.7 || data-sort-value="0.54" | 540 m || multiple || 2003–2020 || 11 Oct 2020 || 82 || align=left | Alt.: 2010 VX129 || 
|- id="2003 UY38" bgcolor=#d6d6d6
| 0 ||  || MBA-O || 17.3 || 1.9 km || multiple || 2001–2020 || 16 Dec 2020 || 49 || align=left | — || 
|- id="2003 UZ38" bgcolor=#fefefe
| 1 ||  || MBA-I || 18.4 || data-sort-value="0.62" | 620 m || multiple || 2003–2020 || 16 Mar 2020 || 85 || align=left | Alt.: 2012 AY3 || 
|- id="2003 UC39" bgcolor=#d6d6d6
| – ||  || MBA-O || 18.4 || 1.2 km || single || 17 days || 19 Oct 2003 || 9 || align=left | — || 
|- id="2003 UF39" bgcolor=#fefefe
| 0 ||  || MBA-I || 18.1 || data-sort-value="0.71" | 710 m || multiple || 2003–2020 || 02 Feb 2020 || 62 || align=left | Alt.: 2014 OG221 || 
|- id="2003 UZ39" bgcolor=#d6d6d6
| 0 ||  || HIL || 16.9 || 2.3 km || multiple || 2003–2019 || 24 Dec 2019 || 46 || align=left | Alt.: 2011 WC35 || 
|- id="2003 UG40" bgcolor=#d6d6d6
| 0 ||  || MBA-O || 16.1 || 3.4 km || multiple || 2002–2021 || 04 Jan 2021 || 119 || align=left | — || 
|- id="2003 UM40" bgcolor=#fefefe
| 0 ||  || MBA-I || 19.1 || data-sort-value="0.45" | 450 m || multiple || 1996–2017 || 23 Nov 2017 || 41 || align=left | Alt.: 2010 UB99 || 
|- id="2003 UK41" bgcolor=#d6d6d6
| 0 ||  || HIL || 16.6 || 2.7 km || multiple || 2003–2021 || 07 Jan 2021 || 87 || align=left | Alt.: 2011 UN100 || 
|- id="2003 UQ41" bgcolor=#E9E9E9
| 3 ||  || MBA-M || 18.8 || data-sort-value="0.73" | 730 m || multiple || 2003–2016 || 04 Oct 2016 || 21 || align=left | — || 
|- id="2003 UT41" bgcolor=#fefefe
| 2 ||  || MBA-I || 18.3 || data-sort-value="0.65" | 650 m || multiple || 2003–2017 || 18 May 2017 || 27 || align=left | Alt.: 2014 SV311 || 
|- id="2003 UY41" bgcolor=#fefefe
| 3 ||  || MBA-I || 18.8 || data-sort-value="0.52" | 520 m || multiple || 2003–2014 || 25 Oct 2014 || 39 || align=left | Alt.: 2014 UV99 || 
|- id="2003 UB42" bgcolor=#E9E9E9
| 1 ||  || MBA-M || 18.1 || 1.0 km || multiple || 2003–2020 || 11 Oct 2020 || 38 || align=left | — || 
|- id="2003 UQ42" bgcolor=#FA8072
| 0 ||  || HUN || 19.17 || data-sort-value="0.44" | 440 m || multiple || 2003–2021 || 05 Dec 2021 || 78 || align=left | — || 
|- id="2003 UY42" bgcolor=#E9E9E9
| 0 ||  || MBA-M || 17.9 || 1.1 km || multiple || 2002–2016 || 01 Nov 2016 || 54 || align=left | — || 
|- id="2003 UZ42" bgcolor=#E9E9E9
| – ||  || MBA-M || 18.9 || data-sort-value="0.70" | 700 m || single || 7 days || 24 Oct 2003 || 8 || align=left | — || 
|- id="2003 UE43" bgcolor=#fefefe
| 0 ||  || MBA-I || 18.72 || data-sort-value="0.54" | 540 m || multiple || 2003–2021 || 31 Aug 2021 || 50 || align=left | — || 
|- id="2003 US43" bgcolor=#E9E9E9
| 1 ||  || MBA-M || 18.7 || data-sort-value="0.54" | 540 m || multiple || 2003–2019 || 27 Oct 2019 || 77 || align=left | Alt.: 2011 UY174 || 
|- id="2003 UW43" bgcolor=#E9E9E9
| 1 ||  || MBA-M || 18.3 || data-sort-value="0.65" | 650 m || multiple || 2003–2020 || 14 Dec 2020 || 28 || align=left | — || 
|- id="2003 UX43" bgcolor=#d6d6d6
| 0 ||  || MBA-O || 16.4 || 2.9 km || multiple || 1993–2021 || 16 Jan 2021 || 94 || align=left | — || 
|- id="2003 UA44" bgcolor=#E9E9E9
| 0 ||  || MBA-M || 17.6 || 1.3 km || multiple || 2003–2017 || 24 Dec 2017 || 37 || align=left | Alt.: 2012 TY161 || 
|- id="2003 UM44" bgcolor=#E9E9E9
| 1 ||  || MBA-M || 17.9 || data-sort-value="0.78" | 780 m || multiple || 2003–2020 || 10 Dec 2020 || 48 || align=left | Alt.: 2015 MR112 || 
|- id="2003 UB45" bgcolor=#d6d6d6
| 0 ||  || MBA-O || 16.2 || 3.2 km || multiple || 2001–2019 || 24 Dec 2019 || 140 || align=left | Alt.: 2014 UR216 || 
|- id="2003 UD45" bgcolor=#E9E9E9
| 1 ||  || MBA-M || 17.7 || 1.6 km || multiple || 2003–2019 || 16 Jan 2019 || 31 || align=left | Disc.: SpacewatchAdded on 21 August 2021 || 
|- id="2003 UG45" bgcolor=#E9E9E9
| 1 ||  || MBA-M || 17.8 || data-sort-value="0.82" | 820 m || multiple || 1999–2019 || 30 Jun 2019 || 36 || align=left | — || 
|- id="2003 UH45" bgcolor=#E9E9E9
| 0 ||  || MBA-M || 17.88 || 1.5 km || multiple || 2003–2021 || 01 Oct 2021 || 37 || align=left | Disc.: SpacewatchAdded on 30 September 2021 || 
|- id="2003 UK45" bgcolor=#E9E9E9
| 3 ||  || MBA-M || 18.9 || data-sort-value="0.70" | 700 m || multiple || 2003–2020 || 23 Oct 2020 || 36 || align=left | Disc.: SpacewatchAdded on 17 January 2021 || 
|- id="2003 UL45" bgcolor=#E9E9E9
| 1 ||  || MBA-M || 18.7 || data-sort-value="0.76" | 760 m || multiple || 2003–2020 || 05 Nov 2020 || 48 || align=left | — || 
|- id="2003 UX45" bgcolor=#d6d6d6
| 0 ||  || MBA-O || 16.8 || 2.4 km || multiple || 2003–2020 || 07 Dec 2020 || 107 || align=left | Alt.: 2014 QX170 || 
|- id="2003 UY45" bgcolor=#E9E9E9
| – ||  || MBA-M || 19.2 || data-sort-value="0.43" | 430 m || single || 8 days || 26 Oct 2003 || 9 || align=left | — || 
|- id="2003 UH46" bgcolor=#fefefe
| 3 ||  || MBA-I || 18.8 || data-sort-value="0.52" | 520 m || multiple || 2003–2012 || 21 Mar 2012 || 23 || align=left | Disc.: SpacewatchAdded on 22 July 2020Alt.: 2005 JC13 || 
|- id="2003 UL46" bgcolor=#E9E9E9
| 0 ||  || MBA-M || 17.9 || 1.5 km || multiple || 2003–2021 || 28 Oct 2021 || 63 || align=left | Disc.: SpacewatchAdded on 29 January 2022 || 
|- id="2003 UM46" bgcolor=#fefefe
| 2 ||  || MBA-I || 19.0 || data-sort-value="0.47" | 470 m || multiple || 2003–2017 || 21 Oct 2017 || 50 || align=left | Alt.: 2010 TA92 || 
|- id="2003 UZ47" bgcolor=#E9E9E9
| 0 ||  || MBA-M || 17.2 || 1.5 km || multiple || 2003–2021 || 06 Jan 2021 || 147 || align=left | — || 
|- id="2003 UB48" bgcolor=#E9E9E9
| 0 ||  || MBA-M || 18.16 || 1.3 km || multiple || 2003–2021 || 27 Nov 2021 || 126 || align=left | Alt.: 2012 TA175 || 
|- id="2003 UA51" bgcolor=#d6d6d6
| 0 ||  || MBA-O || 16.4 || 2.9 km || multiple || 2003–2021 || 16 Jan 2021 || 82 || align=left | Disc.: NEATAdded on 22 July 2020Alt.: 2010 DP27 || 
|- id="2003 UC51" bgcolor=#d6d6d6
| 0 ||  || MBA-O || 16.0 || 3.5 km || multiple || 2003–2021 || 12 Jan 2021 || 157 || align=left | — || 
|- id="2003 UD51" bgcolor=#d6d6d6
| 0 ||  || MBA-O || 16.45 || 2.9 km || multiple || 2003–2022 || 24 Jan 2022 || 94 || align=left | Disc.: NEATAdded on 17 January 2021Alt.: 2010 CD6 || 
|- id="2003 UM51" bgcolor=#E9E9E9
| 0 ||  || MBA-M || 17.18 || 1.5 km || multiple || 2003–2022 || 10 Jan 2022 || 247 || align=left | — || 
|- id="2003 UQ51" bgcolor=#E9E9E9
| 1 ||  || MBA-M || 17.2 || 1.1 km || multiple || 2003–2021 || 21 Jan 2021 || 106 || align=left | Alt.: 2007 TR138 || 
|- id="2003 UB52" bgcolor=#E9E9E9
| 0 ||  || MBA-M || 17.21 || 1.5 km || multiple || 1999–2022 || 26 Jan 2022 || 200 || align=left | — || 
|- id="2003 UM52" bgcolor=#d6d6d6
| 0 ||  || MBA-O || 16.9 || 2.3 km || multiple || 2003–2021 || 16 Jan 2021 || 130 || align=left | — || 
|- id="2003 UT55" bgcolor=#FFC2E0
| 7 ||  || ATE || 26.8 || data-sort-value="0.016" | 16 m || single || 0 day || 27 Oct 2003 || 22 || align=left | — || 
|- id="2003 UR56" bgcolor=#d6d6d6
| 0 ||  || MBA-O || 16.36 || 3.0 km || multiple || 2003–2021 || 01 Apr 2021 || 223 || align=left | Alt.: 2014 UW32 || 
|- id="2003 UH57" bgcolor=#fefefe
| 0 ||  || MBA-I || 17.76 || data-sort-value="0.83" | 830 m || multiple || 2003–2021 || 10 Apr 2021 || 115 || align=left | — || 
|- id="2003 UT57" bgcolor=#d6d6d6
| 0 ||  || MBA-O || 15.71 || 4.0 km || multiple || 2001–2021 || 02 May 2021 || 190 || align=left | Alt.: 2008 UV372, 2010 EC65, 2016 GE142 || 
|- id="2003 UJ58" bgcolor=#d6d6d6
| 0 ||  || MBA-O || 16.8 || 2.4 km || multiple || 2003–2021 || 06 Jan 2021 || 89 || align=left | — || 
|- id="2003 UQ58" bgcolor=#E9E9E9
| 0 ||  || MBA-M || 17.61 || 1.3 km || multiple || 2003–2021 || 03 Dec 2021 || 83 || align=left | — || 
|- id="2003 US58" bgcolor=#fefefe
| 0 ||  || MBA-I || 17.23 || 1.1 km || multiple || 1999–2021 || 02 May 2021 || 113 || align=left | Alt.: 2018 NG9 || 
|- id="2003 UT58" bgcolor=#E9E9E9
| 0 ||  || MBA-M || 17.4 || 1.4 km || multiple || 2003–2020 || 06 Dec 2020 || 176 || align=left | — || 
|- id="2003 UM59" bgcolor=#d6d6d6
| 0 ||  || MBA-O || 17.2 || 2.0 km || multiple || 2000–2020 || 22 Jan 2020 || 83 || align=left | — || 
|- id="2003 UQ59" bgcolor=#d6d6d6
| 0 ||  || MBA-O || 16.32 || 3.0 km || multiple || 2003–2021 || 06 Apr 2021 || 114 || align=left | — || 
|- id="2003 UT59" bgcolor=#E9E9E9
| 0 ||  || MBA-M || 17.2 || 1.1 km || multiple || 2003–2021 || 21 Jan 2021 || 78 || align=left | Alt.: 2015 RJ188 || 
|- id="2003 UG67" bgcolor=#fefefe
| 0 ||  || MBA-I || 18.2 || data-sort-value="0.68" | 680 m || multiple || 2003–2021 || 18 Jan 2021 || 101 || align=left | — || 
|- id="2003 UL67" bgcolor=#fefefe
| 1 ||  || MBA-I || 19.0 || data-sort-value="0.47" | 470 m || multiple || 2003–2020 || 15 Aug 2020 || 34 || align=left | Disc.: LPL/Spacewatch IIAdded on 22 July 2020Alt.: 2010 UC9 || 
|- id="2003 UR67" bgcolor=#d6d6d6
| 1 ||  || MBA-O || 18.1 || 1.3 km || multiple || 2003–2019 || 26 Sep 2019 || 37 || align=left | — || 
|- id="2003 UB68" bgcolor=#fefefe
| 0 ||  || MBA-I || 18.29 || data-sort-value="0.65" | 650 m || multiple || 2003–2021 || 10 Jul 2021 || 67 || align=left | Alt.: 2014 SO312 || 
|- id="2003 UE68" bgcolor=#E9E9E9
| 0 ||  || MBA-M || 18.16 || 1.3 km || multiple || 2003–2021 || 10 Jul 2021 || 42 || align=left | — || 
|- id="2003 UN68" bgcolor=#d6d6d6
| 0 ||  || MBA-O || 16.7 || 2.5 km || multiple || 2003–2021 || 18 Jan 2021 || 83 || align=left | Alt.: 2016 AU116 || 
|- id="2003 US68" bgcolor=#E9E9E9
| 1 ||  || MBA-M || 17.87 || 1.5 km || multiple || 1994–2021 || 30 Nov 2021 || 37 || align=left | Disc.: SpacewatchAdded on 22 July 2020 || 
|- id="2003 UV68" bgcolor=#d6d6d6
| 2 ||  || MBA-O || 17.4 || 1.8 km || multiple || 2003–2020 || 11 Nov 2020 || 42 || align=left | Disc.: SpacewatchAdded on 17 January 2021 || 
|- id="2003 UG69" bgcolor=#d6d6d6
| 0 ||  || MBA-O || 17.1 || 2.1 km || multiple || 2003–2020 || 10 Dec 2020 || 51 || align=left | Alt.: 2009 XS30 || 
|- id="2003 UM69" bgcolor=#d6d6d6
| 0 ||  || MBA-O || 16.8 || 2.4 km || multiple || 2003–2021 || 07 Jan 2021 || 95 || align=left | Alt.: 2013 PL60 || 
|- id="2003 UO69" bgcolor=#E9E9E9
| 0 ||  || MBA-M || 17.78 || data-sort-value="0.83" | 830 m || multiple || 2003–2022 || 26 Jan 2022 || 109 || align=left | — || 
|- id="2003 UQ69" bgcolor=#E9E9E9
| 0 ||  || MBA-M || 17.42 || 1.8 km || multiple || 2003–2022 || 06 Jan 2022 || 135 || align=left | Alt.: 2012 TF188 || 
|- id="2003 US69" bgcolor=#fefefe
| 0 ||  || MBA-I || 18.89 || data-sort-value="0.50" | 500 m || multiple || 2003–2021 || 29 Oct 2021 || 85 || align=left | — || 
|- id="2003 UX69" bgcolor=#d6d6d6
| 0 ||  || MBA-O || 16.6 || 2.7 km || multiple || 2003–2020 || 24 Oct 2020 || 144 || align=left | Alt.: 2013 LN19 || 
|- id="2003 UD70" bgcolor=#E9E9E9
| 1 ||  || MBA-M || 18.7 || data-sort-value="0.76" | 760 m || multiple || 2003–2020 || 14 Dec 2020 || 56 || align=left | — || 
|- id="2003 UK70" bgcolor=#E9E9E9
| 3 ||  || MBA-M || 18.1 || data-sort-value="0.71" | 710 m || multiple || 2003–2020 || 11 Dec 2020 || 26 || align=left | Disc.: SpacewatchAdded on 9 March 2021Alt.: 2020 UT34 || 
|- id="2003 UP70" bgcolor=#fefefe
| 2 ||  || MBA-I || 19.1 || data-sort-value="0.45" | 450 m || multiple || 2003–2017 || 20 Nov 2017 || 36 || align=left | Alt.: 2010 SJ6 || 
|- id="2003 UR70" bgcolor=#E9E9E9
| 0 ||  || MBA-M || 17.4 || 1.4 km || multiple || 1999–2020 || 24 Oct 2020 || 115 || align=left | Alt.: 2013 AN66 || 
|- id="2003 UU70" bgcolor=#fefefe
| 0 ||  || MBA-I || 18.6 || data-sort-value="0.57" | 570 m || multiple || 2003–2018 || 13 Aug 2018 || 43 || align=left | Alt.: 2007 VW283 || 
|- id="2003 UF71" bgcolor=#fefefe
| 0 ||  || MBA-I || 18.60 || data-sort-value="0.57" | 570 m || multiple || 1992–2021 || 25 Nov 2021 || 111 || align=left | Alt.: 2010 QA4 || 
|- id="2003 UR71" bgcolor=#E9E9E9
| 1 ||  || MBA-M || 17.8 || data-sort-value="0.82" | 820 m || multiple || 2002–2019 || 29 Oct 2019 || 81 || align=left | Alt.: 2006 HG108 || 
|- id="2003 UD72" bgcolor=#fefefe
| 0 ||  || MBA-I || 18.4 || data-sort-value="0.62" | 620 m || multiple || 2003–2021 || 11 Jun 2021 || 96 || align=left | Alt.: 2008 GL5, 2011 CU104, 2011 EX107 || 
|- id="2003 UE72" bgcolor=#d6d6d6
| 0 ||  || MBA-O || 16.99 || 2.2 km || multiple || 2001–2022 || 27 Jan 2022 || 51 || align=left | Alt.: 2010 CV227 || 
|- id="2003 UG72" bgcolor=#d6d6d6
| 0 ||  || MBA-O || 16.62 || 2.6 km || multiple || 2003–2022 || 16 Jan 2022 || 123 || align=left | Alt.: 2010 BT92, 2014 QF370 || 
|- id="2003 UV72" bgcolor=#d6d6d6
| 0 ||  || MBA-O || 17.3 || 1.9 km || multiple || 2003–2020 || 22 Apr 2020 || 53 || align=left | — || 
|- id="2003 UE73" bgcolor=#fefefe
| 0 ||  || MBA-I || 18.60 || data-sort-value="0.57" | 570 m || multiple || 2003–2021 || 04 Aug 2021 || 58 || align=left | — || 
|- id="2003 UQ73" bgcolor=#E9E9E9
| 0 ||  || MBA-M || 17.9 || 1.1 km || multiple || 2003–2021 || 12 Jan 2021 || 108 || align=left | — || 
|- id="2003 US73" bgcolor=#E9E9E9
| 2 ||  || MBA-M || 18.2 || data-sort-value="0.68" | 680 m || multiple || 2003–2021 || 07 Jan 2021 || 81 || align=left | Alt.: 2015 VQ9 || 
|- id="2003 UX73" bgcolor=#fefefe
| 0 ||  || HUN || 18.51 || data-sort-value="0.59" | 590 m || multiple || 2003–2021 || 19 Nov 2021 || 130 || align=left | Alt.: 2010 JA173 || 
|- id="2003 UB74" bgcolor=#fefefe
| 0 ||  || MBA-I || 18.3 || data-sort-value="0.65" | 650 m || multiple || 2003–2020 || 14 Feb 2020 || 61 || align=left | — || 
|- id="2003 US75" bgcolor=#E9E9E9
| 0 ||  || MBA-M || 17.7 || 1.2 km || multiple || 2003–2020 || 04 Dec 2020 || 71 || align=left | Alt.: 2007 RR6 || 
|- id="2003 UG76" bgcolor=#fefefe
| 0 ||  || MBA-I || 17.93 || data-sort-value="0.77" | 770 m || multiple || 2003–2021 || 06 May 2021 || 234 || align=left | — || 
|- id="2003 UD77" bgcolor=#fefefe
| 3 ||  || MBA-I || 17.9 || data-sort-value="0.78" | 780 m || multiple || 2003–2019 || 19 Dec 2019 || 67 || align=left | Alt.: 2007 VR288 || 
|- id="2003 UY77" bgcolor=#E9E9E9
| 0 ||  || MBA-M || 18.3 || data-sort-value="0.92" | 920 m || multiple || 2003–2020 || 14 Dec 2020 || 77 || align=left | — || 
|- id="2003 UJ78" bgcolor=#E9E9E9
| 0 ||  || MBA-M || 16.9 || 1.8 km || multiple || 2000–2021 || 09 Jan 2021 || 249 || align=left | — || 
|- id="2003 UK79" bgcolor=#E9E9E9
| 0 ||  || MBA-M || 16.30 || 2.3 km || multiple || 2003–2021 || 08 Dec 2021 || 169 || align=left | Alt.: 2007 PN36, 2010 JX20, 2014 BT28 || 
|- id="2003 UO79" bgcolor=#d6d6d6
| 1 ||  || MBA-O || 17.1 || 2.1 km || multiple || 2003–2021 || 12 Jan 2021 || 93 || align=left | Alt.: 2020 SG8 || 
|- id="2003 UE80" bgcolor=#d6d6d6
| 0 ||  || MBA-O || 16.8 || 2.4 km || multiple || 2003–2020 || 23 Dec 2020 || 196 || align=left | — || 
|- id="2003 UG82" bgcolor=#E9E9E9
| 0 ||  || MBA-M || 17.79 || 1.2 km || multiple || 2003–2022 || 07 Jan 2022 || 39 || align=left | Alt.: 2016 QC102 || 
|- id="2003 UA84" bgcolor=#d6d6d6
| 0 ||  || MBA-O || 17.0 || 2.2 km || multiple || 2003–2019 || 28 Nov 2019 || 48 || align=left | — || 
|- id="2003 UC84" bgcolor=#E9E9E9
| 0 ||  || MBA-M || 17.7 || data-sort-value="0.86" | 860 m || multiple || 2003–2021 || 05 Mar 2021 || 42 || align=left | Alt.: 2017 BH178 || 
|- id="2003 UK84" bgcolor=#fefefe
| 0 ||  || MBA-I || 18.7 || data-sort-value="0.54" | 540 m || multiple || 2002–2019 || 02 Jan 2019 || 69 || align=left | — || 
|- id="2003 UL84" bgcolor=#E9E9E9
| 0 ||  || MBA-M || 17.96 || 1.4 km || multiple || 2003–2022 || 07 Jan 2022 || 39 || align=left | Alt.: 2014 ES208 || 
|- id="2003 UY84" bgcolor=#E9E9E9
| 2 ||  || MBA-M || 18.6 || data-sort-value="0.80" | 800 m || multiple || 2003–2020 || 17 Nov 2020 || 130 || align=left | Disc.: LPL/Spacewatch IIAdded on 17 January 2021 || 
|- id="2003 UE85" bgcolor=#fefefe
| 0 ||  || MBA-I || 18.94 || data-sort-value="0.48" | 480 m || multiple || 2003–2021 || 30 Nov 2021 || 87 || align=left | Alt.: 2014 WF409 || 
|- id="2003 UH85" bgcolor=#E9E9E9
| 0 ||  || MBA-M || 17.79 || 1.5 km || multiple || 2003–2021 || 08 Sep 2021 || 44 || align=left | Disc.: LPL/Spacewatch IIAdded on 21 August 2021 || 
|- id="2003 UR85" bgcolor=#E9E9E9
| 0 ||  || MBA-M || 18.15 || data-sort-value="0.99" | 990 m || multiple || 2003–2022 || 27 Jan 2022 || 118 || align=left | Disc.: LPL/Spacewatch IIAdded on 24 August 2020 || 
|- id="2003 UC87" bgcolor=#E9E9E9
| 0 ||  || MBA-M || 16.61 || 2.0 km || multiple || 2003–2021 || 18 Nov 2021 || 258 || align=left | Alt.: 2012 XN133 || 
|- id="2003 UD87" bgcolor=#d6d6d6
| 0 ||  || MBA-O || 17.27 || 2.0 km || multiple || 2003–2021 || 11 Nov 2021 || 78 || align=left | Alt.: 2010 BP104 || 
|- id="2003 UK87" bgcolor=#E9E9E9
| 0 ||  || MBA-M || 15.7 || 4.0 km || multiple || 2003–2020 || 18 May 2020 || 152 || align=left | Alt.: 2008 WQ142, 2010 CV128, 2010 JV186, 2015 BU35, 2017 OB31 || 
|- id="2003 UA88" bgcolor=#d6d6d6
| 0 ||  || MBA-O || 17.3 || 1.9 km || multiple || 2003–2020 || 06 Dec 2020 || 47 || align=left | — || 
|- id="2003 UC88" bgcolor=#E9E9E9
| 0 ||  || MBA-M || 17.67 || 1.2 km || multiple || 2001–2021 || 02 Dec 2021 || 51 || align=left | Disc.: SpacewatchAdded on 21 August 2021 || 
|- id="2003 UE88" bgcolor=#fefefe
| 0 ||  || MBA-I || 17.8 || data-sort-value="0.82" | 820 m || multiple || 2001–2020 || 18 Apr 2020 || 95 || align=left | Alt.: 2007 VY282, 2016 CN168 || 
|- id="2003 UE89" bgcolor=#E9E9E9
| 0 ||  || MBA-M || 17.5 || data-sort-value="0.94" | 940 m || multiple || 2003–2021 || 16 Jan 2021 || 74 || align=left | Disc.: SpacewatchAdded on 22 July 2020Alt.: 2007 RH154, 2009 CJ66 || 
|- id="2003 UF89" bgcolor=#E9E9E9
| 0 ||  || MBA-M || 17.34 || 1.9 km || multiple || 2003–2021 || 08 Nov 2021 || 105 || align=left | — || 
|- id="2003 UR89" bgcolor=#E9E9E9
| 2 ||  || MBA-M || 18.1 || 1.3 km || multiple || 2003–2021 || 25 Nov 2021 || 31 || align=left | Disc.: LPL/Spacewatch IIAdded on 24 December 2021 || 
|- id="2003 US89" bgcolor=#fefefe
| 0 ||  || MBA-I || 18.1 || data-sort-value="0.71" | 710 m || multiple || 2003–2021 || 12 Jun 2021 || 104 || align=left | Alt.: 2014 OG104 || 
|- id="2003 UX89" bgcolor=#d6d6d6
| 0 ||  || MBA-O || 16.1 || 2.7 km || multiple || 1992–2021 || 11 Jan 2021 || 197 || align=left | Alt.: 2005 GM42, 2010 EB26, 2012 LZ6 || 
|- id="2003 UB90" bgcolor=#E9E9E9
| 0 ||  || MBA-M || 17.2 || 1.5 km || multiple || 2003–2020 || 15 Sep 2020 || 130 || align=left | Alt.: 2003 UV253 || 
|- id="2003 UF90" bgcolor=#d6d6d6
| 0 ||  || MBA-O || 17.1 || 2.1 km || multiple || 1992–2019 || 27 Oct 2019 || 49 || align=left | — || 
|- id="2003 UE91" bgcolor=#fefefe
| 0 ||  || MBA-I || 18.14 || data-sort-value="0.70" | 700 m || multiple || 2003–2021 || 15 Apr 2021 || 123 || align=left | Alt.: 2006 QU53, 2012 KZ39 || 
|- id="2003 UW91" bgcolor=#d6d6d6
| 2 ||  || MBA-O || 17.2 || 2.0 km || multiple || 2003–2020 || 05 Nov 2020 || 49 || align=left | Alt.: 2014 QX436 || 
|- id="2003 UA92" bgcolor=#d6d6d6
| 0 ||  || MBA-O || 16.8 || 2.4 km || multiple || 2003–2020 || 14 Dec 2020 || 230 || align=left | Alt.: 2010 DO97 || 
|- id="2003 UP92" bgcolor=#fefefe
| 0 ||  || MBA-I || 17.3 || 1.0 km || multiple || 2003–2020 || 27 Apr 2020 || 178 || align=left | Alt.: 2014 SA141 || 
|- id="2003 UE93" bgcolor=#d6d6d6
| 0 ||  || MBA-O || 15.8 || 3.9 km || multiple || 2003–2021 || 16 Jan 2021 || 174 || align=left | — || 
|- id="2003 UU95" bgcolor=#fefefe
| 0 ||  || MBA-I || 18.30 || data-sort-value="0.65" | 650 m || multiple || 2003–2021 || 30 Nov 2021 || 133 || align=left | — || 
|- id="2003 UD96" bgcolor=#E9E9E9
| 0 ||  || MBA-M || 17.7 || data-sort-value="0.86" | 860 m || multiple || 2003–2021 || 17 Jan 2021 || 78 || align=left | — || 
|- id="2003 UG96" bgcolor=#E9E9E9
| 1 ||  || MBA-M || 17.8 || data-sort-value="0.82" | 820 m || multiple || 2003–2020 || 17 Dec 2020 || 63 || align=left | — || 
|- id="2003 UJ97" bgcolor=#fefefe
| 2 ||  || MBA-I || 18.4 || data-sort-value="0.62" | 620 m || multiple || 1996–2020 || 23 Aug 2020 || 85 || align=left | Alt.: 2010 UH10 || 
|- id="2003 UQ97" bgcolor=#FA8072
| 2 ||  || MCA || 19.1 || data-sort-value="0.45" | 450 m || multiple || 2003–2013 || 29 Sep 2013 || 40 || align=left | Alt.: 2013 QZ15 || 
|- id="2003 UV97" bgcolor=#E9E9E9
| 1 ||  || MBA-M || 17.05 || 1.2 km || multiple || 2003–2021 || 05 Apr 2021 || 41 || align=left | — || 
|- id="2003 UL103" bgcolor=#E9E9E9
| 0 ||  || MBA-M || 17.3 || 1.5 km || multiple || 2003–2020 || 20 May 2020 || 62 || align=left | Alt.: 2015 HP68 || 
|- id="2003 UB105" bgcolor=#E9E9E9
| 1 ||  || MBA-M || 17.3 || 1.9 km || multiple || 2003–2019 || 04 Feb 2019 || 73 || align=left | Alt.: 2017 SN88 || 
|- id="2003 UM105" bgcolor=#E9E9E9
| 0 ||  || MBA-M || 17.1 || 1.6 km || multiple || 2002–2021 || 05 Jan 2021 || 191 || align=left | Alt.: 2007 TA352 || 
|- id="2003 UP106" bgcolor=#fefefe
| 1 ||  || MBA-I || 18.1 || data-sort-value="0.71" | 710 m || multiple || 2003–2020 || 16 Oct 2020 || 57 || align=left | Alt.: 2010 VX21 || 
|- id="2003 UV106" bgcolor=#fefefe
| 0 ||  || MBA-I || 18.1 || data-sort-value="0.71" | 710 m || multiple || 1996–2020 || 06 Dec 2020 || 221 || align=left | — || 
|- id="2003 UH107" bgcolor=#E9E9E9
| 0 ||  || MBA-M || 17.8 || 1.2 km || multiple || 1999–2020 || 14 Dec 2020 || 137 || align=left | — || 
|- id="2003 UQ107" bgcolor=#fefefe
| 0 ||  || MBA-I || 18.51 || data-sort-value="0.59" | 590 m || multiple || 2003–2021 || 25 Nov 2021 || 105 || align=left | Alt.: 2010 PA75, 2014 WO18 || 
|- id="2003 UD108" bgcolor=#fefefe
| 0 ||  || MBA-I || 18.73 || data-sort-value="0.53" | 530 m || multiple || 2003–2021 || 30 Oct 2021 || 77 || align=left | — || 
|- id="2003 UR108" bgcolor=#d6d6d6
| 0 ||  || MBA-O || 16.50 || 2.8 km || multiple || 2000–2021 || 08 Apr 2021 || 196 || align=left | Alt.: 2015 BX208, 2016 EN111 || 
|- id="2003 UO109" bgcolor=#d6d6d6
| 0 ||  || MBA-O || 16.4 || 2.9 km || multiple || 2003–2020 || 05 Dec 2020 || 118 || align=left | Alt.: 2008 RY13, 2012 JP29, 2014 UO143 || 
|- id="2003 UD111" bgcolor=#E9E9E9
| 0 ||  || MBA-M || 16.95 || 2.3 km || multiple || 1994–2022 || 22 Jan 2022 || 226 || align=left | Alt.: 2012 TN197 || 
|- id="2003 UL111" bgcolor=#d6d6d6
| 0 ||  || MBA-O || 16.55 || 2.7 km || multiple || 2003–2022 || 27 Jan 2022 || 172 || align=left | Alt.: 2010 CF52, 2011 BM65 || 
|- id="2003 UP111" bgcolor=#fefefe
| 0 ||  || MBA-I || 17.98 || data-sort-value="0.75" | 750 m || multiple || 1999–2021 || 07 Apr 2021 || 48 || align=left | Alt.: 2018 PL1 || 
|- id="2003 UX111" bgcolor=#E9E9E9
| 0 ||  || MBA-M || 17.53 || 1.7 km || multiple || 2003–2021 || 05 Nov 2021 || 68 || align=left | Disc.: NEATAdded on 30 September 2021 || 
|- id="2003 UD112" bgcolor=#fefefe
| 0 ||  || MBA-I || 18.1 || data-sort-value="0.71" | 710 m || multiple || 2003–2021 || 04 Jan 2021 || 61 || align=left | — || 
|- id="2003 UF114" bgcolor=#E9E9E9
| 1 ||  || MBA-M || 17.9 || data-sort-value="0.78" | 780 m || multiple || 1999–2021 || 17 Jan 2021 || 34 || align=left | Disc.: SpacewatchAdded on 17 January 2021 || 
|- id="2003 UX114" bgcolor=#fefefe
| 0 ||  || MBA-I || 18.3 || data-sort-value="0.65" | 650 m || multiple || 2003–2019 || 25 Nov 2019 || 154 || align=left | — || 
|- id="2003 UF115" bgcolor=#E9E9E9
| 1 ||  || MBA-M || 18.2 || data-sort-value="0.96" | 960 m || multiple || 2003–2020 || 08 Dec 2020 || 73 || align=left | — || 
|- id="2003 UH115" bgcolor=#d6d6d6
| 2 ||  || MBA-O || 18.0 || 1.4 km || multiple || 2003–2018 || 14 Aug 2018 || 33 || align=left | Alt.: 2008 TO150 || 
|- id="2003 UZ115" bgcolor=#E9E9E9
| 0 ||  || MBA-M || 17.3 || 1.5 km || multiple || 2003–2020 || 20 Dec 2020 || 130 || align=left | — || 
|- id="2003 UB116" bgcolor=#fefefe
| 1 ||  || MBA-I || 18.6 || data-sort-value="0.57" | 570 m || multiple || 2003–2017 || 20 Dec 2017 || 56 || align=left | Alt.: 2015 BM124 || 
|- id="2003 UL116" bgcolor=#fefefe
| 0 ||  || MBA-I || 18.4 || data-sort-value="0.62" | 620 m || multiple || 2003–2020 || 10 Nov 2020 || 103 || align=left | — || 
|- id="2003 UM117" bgcolor=#E9E9E9
| 2 ||  || MBA-M || 17.7 || 1.2 km || multiple || 2003–2020 || 31 May 2020 || 47 || align=left | — || 
|- id="2003 UR117" bgcolor=#FA8072
| 0 ||  || MCA || 17.8 || 1.2 km || multiple || 2003–2021 || 09 Jan 2021 || 236 || align=left | — || 
|- id="2003 UH119" bgcolor=#E9E9E9
| 0 ||  || MBA-M || 17.3 || 1.0 km || multiple || 2003–2021 || 15 Jan 2021 || 113 || align=left | Alt.: 2011 QK56, 2015 RZ5 || 
|- id="2003 UK119" bgcolor=#E9E9E9
| 0 ||  || MBA-M || 17.3 || 1.5 km || multiple || 2001–2020 || 09 Dec 2020 || 82 || align=left | — || 
|- id="2003 UP120" bgcolor=#fefefe
| 1 ||  || MBA-I || 18.2 || data-sort-value="0.68" | 680 m || multiple || 2003–2018 || 11 Aug 2018 || 28 || align=left | Alt.: 2007 WW18 || 
|- id="2003 UR120" bgcolor=#d6d6d6
| 2 ||  || MBA-O || 17.4 || 1.8 km || multiple || 2003–2019 || 27 Nov 2019 || 89 || align=left | — || 
|- id="2003 UT121" bgcolor=#E9E9E9
| 1 ||  || MBA-M || 17.8 || 1.2 km || multiple || 2003–2020 || 14 Dec 2020 || 141 || align=left | Disc.: NEATAdded on 9 March 2021Alt.: 2020 PP8 || 
|- id="2003 UH123" bgcolor=#d6d6d6
| 0 ||  || MBA-O || 17.0 || 2.2 km || multiple || 2003–2020 || 17 Nov 2020 || 50 || align=left | Disc.: SpacewatchAdded on 17 January 2021 || 
|- id="2003 UW123" bgcolor=#fefefe
| 0 ||  || MBA-I || 18.8 || data-sort-value="0.52" | 520 m || multiple || 2003–2020 || 14 Nov 2020 || 73 || align=left | — || 
|- id="2003 UX123" bgcolor=#E9E9E9
| 1 ||  || MBA-M || 18.0 || data-sort-value="0.75" | 750 m || multiple || 2003–2021 || 11 Jan 2021 || 51 || align=left | — || 
|- id="2003 UK124" bgcolor=#d6d6d6
| 0 ||  || MBA-O || 16.41 || 2.9 km || multiple || 2003–2021 || 13 May 2021 || 126 || align=left | Alt.: 2010 FF125, 2018 RO35 || 
|- id="2003 US124" bgcolor=#d6d6d6
| 0 ||  || MBA-O || 17.2 || 2.0 km || multiple || 2003–2021 || 15 Apr 2021 || 38 || align=left | Disc.: SpacewatchAdded on 5 November 2021 || 
|- id="2003 UT124" bgcolor=#fefefe
| 0 ||  || MBA-I || 18.2 || data-sort-value="0.68" | 680 m || multiple || 2003–2017 || 11 Nov 2017 || 71 || align=left | Alt.: 2010 TC185 || 
|- id="2003 UC125" bgcolor=#E9E9E9
| 0 ||  || MBA-M || 17.1 || 1.6 km || multiple || 2003–2020 || 17 Dec 2020 || 140 || align=left | — || 
|- id="2003 US125" bgcolor=#E9E9E9
| 1 ||  || MBA-M || 17.5 || data-sort-value="0.94" | 940 m || multiple || 1999–2019 || 28 Jun 2019 || 38 || align=left | Alt.: 2015 TJ338 || 
|- id="2003 UW125" bgcolor=#fefefe
| 0 ||  || MBA-I || 18.0 || data-sort-value="0.75" | 750 m || multiple || 2003–2019 || 02 Jan 2019 || 109 || align=left | — || 
|- id="2003 UB126" bgcolor=#fefefe
| 0 ||  || MBA-I || 17.82 || data-sort-value="0.81" | 810 m || multiple || 1992–2021 || 06 Sep 2021 || 203 || align=left | Alt.: 2012 BS111 || 
|- id="2003 UB127" bgcolor=#d6d6d6
| 1 ||  || MBA-O || 17.3 || 1.9 km || multiple || 2001–2018 || 07 Sep 2018 || 58 || align=left | — || 
|- id="2003 UF127" bgcolor=#d6d6d6
| 0 ||  || MBA-O || 17.0 || 2.2 km || multiple || 2003–2021 || 16 Jan 2021 || 97 || align=left | Alt.: 2003 UW310, 2016 CV151 || 
|- id="2003 UU127" bgcolor=#fefefe
| 1 ||  || MBA-I || 18.5 || data-sort-value="0.59" | 590 m || multiple || 2003–2020 || 17 Dec 2020 || 143 || align=left | Alt.: 2003 UU313, 2013 PP94 || 
|- id="2003 UO128" bgcolor=#fefefe
| 0 ||  || MBA-I || 17.9 || data-sort-value="0.78" | 780 m || multiple || 2003–2021 || 15 Apr 2021 || 59 || align=left | Disc.: LPL/Spacewatch IIAdded on 11 May 2021Alt.: 2007 TS201 || 
|- id="2003 UB129" bgcolor=#d6d6d6
| 0 ||  || MBA-O || 17.4 || 1.8 km || multiple || 2003–2019 || 02 Nov 2019 || 37 || align=left | Disc.: SpacewatchAdded on 9 March 2021Alt.: 2019 SO58 || 
|- id="2003 UR130" bgcolor=#E9E9E9
| 0 ||  || MBA-M || 16.95 || 1.2 km || multiple || 2003–2021 || 09 Apr 2021 || 213 || align=left | Alt.: 2015 TV189 || 
|- id="2003 US130" bgcolor=#E9E9E9
| 0 ||  || MBA-M || 17.4 || data-sort-value="0.98" | 980 m || multiple || 2003–2021 || 18 Jan 2021 || 53 || align=left | — || 
|- id="2003 UA131" bgcolor=#E9E9E9
| 0 ||  || MBA-M || 16.9 || 1.8 km || multiple || 2003–2021 || 14 Jan 2021 || 98 || align=left | Alt.: 2013 BL71 || 
|- id="2003 UV133" bgcolor=#E9E9E9
| 0 ||  || MBA-M || 17.4 || data-sort-value="0.98" | 980 m || multiple || 2003–2021 || 21 Jan 2021 || 51 || align=left | — || 
|- id="2003 UD136" bgcolor=#d6d6d6
| 0 ||  || MBA-O || 16.98 || 1.8 km || multiple || 2003–2022 || 27 Jan 2022 || 176 || align=left | Alt.: 2010 EV163 || 
|- id="2003 UT136" bgcolor=#E9E9E9
| 0 ||  || MBA-M || 17.19 || 2.0 km || multiple || 2001–2021 || 27 Sep 2021 || 174 || align=left | Alt.: 2012 RA3 || 
|- id="2003 UE137" bgcolor=#fefefe
| 0 ||  || MBA-I || 17.98 || data-sort-value="0.75" | 750 m || multiple || 2003–2021 || 08 Apr 2021 || 222 || align=left | — || 
|- id="2003 UF137" bgcolor=#d6d6d6
| 0 ||  || MBA-O || 16.49 || 2.8 km || multiple || 2003–2021 || 10 Nov 2021 || 220 || align=left | — || 
|- id="2003 UJ139" bgcolor=#E9E9E9
| 0 ||  || MBA-M || 16.70 || 1.4 km || multiple || 2003–2022 || 27 Jan 2022 || 115 || align=left | Alt.: 2015 PF62 || 
|- id="2003 UL139" bgcolor=#fefefe
| 1 ||  || MBA-I || 17.9 || data-sort-value="0.78" | 780 m || multiple || 2003–2021 || 18 Jan 2021 || 60 || align=left | — || 
|- id="2003 UQ140" bgcolor=#d6d6d6
| 0 ||  || MBA-O || 15.8 || 3.9 km || multiple || 2000–2021 || 15 Jan 2021 || 187 || align=left | Alt.: 2013 PK71 || 
|- id="2003 UH142" bgcolor=#fefefe
| 1 ||  || HUN || 17.9 || data-sort-value="0.78" | 780 m || multiple || 2003–2019 || 20 Dec 2019 || 157 || align=left | Alt.: 2005 JH17, 2011 UB270 || 
|- id="2003 UM149" bgcolor=#fefefe
| 0 ||  || MBA-I || 17.8 || data-sort-value="0.82" | 820 m || multiple || 2003–2020 || 21 Apr 2020 || 141 || align=left | Alt.: 2012 BD85 || 
|- id="2003 UL152" bgcolor=#FA8072
| 1 ||  || MCA || 18.0 || 1.1 km || multiple || 2003–2020 || 14 Jun 2020 || 108 || align=left | — || 
|- id="2003 UM153" bgcolor=#E9E9E9
| 0 ||  || MBA-M || 17.80 || 1.2 km || multiple || 2003–2022 || 23 Jan 2022 || 64 || align=left | Alt.: 2016 WU11 || 
|- id="2003 UP153" bgcolor=#d6d6d6
| 0 ||  || MBA-O || 16.5 || 2.8 km || multiple || 2003–2020 || 05 Jan 2020 || 76 || align=left | — || 
|- id="2003 US153" bgcolor=#E9E9E9
| 2 ||  || MBA-M || 18.6 || 1.1 km || multiple || 2003–2021 || 09 Nov 2021 || 47 || align=left | Disc.: LPL/Spacewatch IIAdded on 24 December 2021 || 
|- id="2003 UT153" bgcolor=#fefefe
| 0 ||  || MBA-I || 18.1 || data-sort-value="0.71" | 710 m || multiple || 2003–2021 || 22 Jan 2021 || 82 || align=left | Disc.: LPL/Spacewatch IIAdded on 30 September 2021Alt.: 2005 HG12 || 
|- id="2003 UB154" bgcolor=#E9E9E9
| 1 ||  || MBA-M || 18.1 || data-sort-value="0.71" | 710 m || multiple || 1999–2019 || 25 Sep 2019 || 51 || align=left | — || 
|- id="2003 UH154" bgcolor=#E9E9E9
| 0 ||  || MBA-M || 17.6 || 1.3 km || multiple || 2003–2020 || 11 Oct 2020 || 97 || align=left | — || 
|- id="2003 UM154" bgcolor=#E9E9E9
| 0 ||  || MBA-M || 17.63 || 1.7 km || multiple || 2003–2021 || 01 Nov 2021 || 73 || align=left | Disc.: SpacewatchAdded on 21 August 2021Alt.: 2015 GC35 || 
|- id="2003 UP154" bgcolor=#d6d6d6
| – ||  || MBA-O || 18.6 || 1.1 km || single || 19 days || 24 Oct 2003 || 12 || align=left | — || 
|- id="2003 UL155" bgcolor=#fefefe
| 0 ||  || MBA-I || 18.77 || data-sort-value="0.52" | 520 m || multiple || 2003–2021 || 08 Dec 2021 || 72 || align=left | Alt.: 2010 HF138 || 
|- id="2003 UQ155" bgcolor=#fefefe
| 0 ||  || MBA-I || 18.80 || data-sort-value="0.52" | 520 m || multiple || 2003–2022 || 06 Jan 2022 || 59 || align=left | — || 
|- id="2003 UX155" bgcolor=#d6d6d6
| 0 ||  || MBA-O || 16.9 || 2.3 km || multiple || 1998–2019 || 02 Nov 2019 || 69 || align=left | Alt.: 2014 WF222 || 
|- id="2003 UY155" bgcolor=#d6d6d6
| 0 ||  || MBA-O || 16.85 || 2.4 km || multiple || 2003–2022 || 27 Jan 2022 || 69 || align=left | — || 
|- id="2003 UL156" bgcolor=#fefefe
| – ||  || MBA-I || 19.3 || data-sort-value="0.41" | 410 m || single || 19 days || 24 Oct 2003 || 11 || align=left | — || 
|- id="2003 UO156" bgcolor=#fefefe
| 0 ||  || MBA-I || 17.77 || data-sort-value="0.83" | 830 m || multiple || 2003–2021 || 11 Jul 2021 || 102 || align=left | Alt.: 2014 OY225 || 
|- id="2003 UC157" bgcolor=#E9E9E9
| 0 ||  || MBA-M || 17.4 || data-sort-value="0.98" | 980 m || multiple || 1999–2021 || 18 Jan 2021 || 108 || align=left | Alt.: 1999 YY24 || 
|- id="2003 UH157" bgcolor=#fefefe
| 0 ||  || MBA-I || 18.36 || data-sort-value="0.63" | 630 m || multiple || 2001–2021 || 13 Jul 2021 || 63 || align=left | — || 
|- id="2003 UA158" bgcolor=#fefefe
| 0 ||  || MBA-I || 18.8 || data-sort-value="0.52" | 520 m || multiple || 2003–2020 || 23 Aug 2020 || 28 || align=left | Disc.: SpacewatchAdded on 21 August 2021 || 
|- id="2003 UY159" bgcolor=#E9E9E9
| 1 ||  || MBA-M || 18.0 || 1.1 km || multiple || 2003–2020 || 07 Oct 2020 || 83 || align=left | — || 
|- id="2003 UJ160" bgcolor=#E9E9E9
| 0 ||  || MBA-M || 17.20 || 2.0 km || multiple || 2003–2021 || 27 Oct 2021 || 125 || align=left | Alt.: 2003 TD || 
|- id="2003 UW160" bgcolor=#d6d6d6
| 0 ||  || MBA-O || 16.78 || 2.5 km || multiple || 2003–2021 || 07 Apr 2021 || 92 || align=left | — || 
|- id="2003 UJ165" bgcolor=#E9E9E9
| 3 ||  || MBA-M || 17.9 || 1.1 km || multiple || 2003–2020 || 17 Dec 2020 || 59 || align=left | — || 
|- id="2003 UZ165" bgcolor=#E9E9E9
| 2 ||  || MBA-M || 18.4 || data-sort-value="0.88" | 880 m || multiple || 2003–2016 || 01 Nov 2016 || 42 || align=left | — || 
|- id="2003 UH166" bgcolor=#fefefe
| 0 ||  || MBA-I || 18.73 || data-sort-value="0.53" | 530 m || multiple || 2003–2021 || 09 Nov 2021 || 63 || align=left | Disc.: SpacewatchAdded on 22 July 2020Alt.: 2010 QQ || 
|- id="2003 UQ166" bgcolor=#fefefe
| 1 ||  || MBA-I || 18.1 || data-sort-value="0.71" | 710 m || multiple || 2003–2020 || 24 Dec 2020 || 86 || align=left | Alt.: 2016 TQ45 || 
|- id="2003 US167" bgcolor=#d6d6d6
| 0 ||  || MBA-O || 16.5 || 2.8 km || multiple || 2003–2020 || 16 Nov 2020 || 58 || align=left | Alt.: 2003 UL415 || 
|- id="2003 UD169" bgcolor=#fefefe
| 1 ||  || MBA-I || 18.75 || data-sort-value="0.53" | 530 m || multiple || 2003–2021 || 04 Jul 2021 || 37 || align=left | — || 
|- id="2003 UN169" bgcolor=#fefefe
| 0 ||  || MBA-I || 18.29 || data-sort-value="0.65" | 650 m || multiple || 2003–2021 || 15 Apr 2021 || 62 || align=left | Alt.: 2006 KE30 || 
|- id="2003 UV170" bgcolor=#fefefe
| 0 ||  || MBA-I || 17.5 || data-sort-value="0.94" | 940 m || multiple || 1999–2020 || 27 Apr 2020 || 124 || align=left | — || 
|- id="2003 UA171" bgcolor=#E9E9E9
| – ||  || MBA-M || 17.7 || data-sort-value="0.86" | 860 m || single || 5 days || 24 Oct 2003 || 11 || align=left | — || 
|- id="2003 UV172" bgcolor=#E9E9E9
| 1 ||  || MBA-M || 18.4 || data-sort-value="0.88" | 880 m || multiple || 2003–2020 || 16 Oct 2020 || 28 || align=left | Disc.: SpacewatchAdded on 9 March 2021 || 
|- id="2003 UY172" bgcolor=#FA8072
| – ||  || MCA || 19.6 || data-sort-value="0.36" | 360 m || single || 27 days || 24 Oct 2003 || 16 || align=left | — || 
|- id="2003 UB173" bgcolor=#E9E9E9
| 0 ||  || MBA-M || 17.0 || 1.7 km || multiple || 2003–2021 || 05 Jan 2021 || 318 || align=left | — || 
|- id="2003 UW176" bgcolor=#E9E9E9
| 3 ||  || MBA-M || 18.3 || data-sort-value="0.92" | 920 m || multiple || 2003–2020 || 16 Dec 2020 || 34 || align=left | Disc.: LONEOSAdded on 9 March 2021 || 
|- id="2003 UX176" bgcolor=#E9E9E9
| 0 ||  || MBA-M || 16.8 || 1.3 km || multiple || 2003–2021 || 09 Jan 2021 || 97 || align=left | Alt.: 2015 KH149 || 
|- id="2003 UN179" bgcolor=#E9E9E9
| 0 ||  || MBA-M || 17.61 || 1.3 km || multiple || 2003–2022 || 10 Jan 2022 || 76 || align=left | Alt.: 2016 SS65 || 
|- id="2003 US181" bgcolor=#fefefe
| 2 ||  || MBA-I || 17.7 || data-sort-value="0.86" | 860 m || multiple || 2003–2020 || 28 Jan 2020 || 59 || align=left | Alt.: 2007 VD318 || 
|- id="2003 UM182" bgcolor=#E9E9E9
| 0 ||  || MBA-M || 17.2 || 1.5 km || multiple || 2003–2021 || 11 Jan 2021 || 158 || align=left | — || 
|- id="2003 UP182" bgcolor=#fefefe
| 0 ||  || MBA-I || 18.3 || data-sort-value="0.65" | 650 m || multiple || 1996–2020 || 10 Nov 2020 || 149 || align=left | Alt.: 1996 TB61 || 
|- id="2003 UX182" bgcolor=#E9E9E9
| 0 ||  || MBA-M || 17.52 || 1.7 km || multiple || 1994–2021 || 27 Nov 2021 || 113 || align=left | — || 
|- id="2003 UZ182" bgcolor=#d6d6d6
| 0 ||  || MBA-O || 17.09 || 2.1 km || multiple || 2003–2021 || 15 Apr 2021 || 174 || align=left | Alt.: 2010 HV72 || 
|- id="2003 UB183" bgcolor=#E9E9E9
| 1 ||  || MBA-M || 17.3 || 1.5 km || multiple || 2003–2021 || 05 Jan 2021 || 124 || align=left | — || 
|- id="2003 UL189" bgcolor=#E9E9E9
| 0 ||  || MBA-M || 17.64 || 1.2 km || multiple || 2003–2021 || 01 Dec 2021 || 35 || align=left | — || 
|- id="2003 UM189" bgcolor=#E9E9E9
| 0 ||  || MBA-M || 17.7 || 1.2 km || multiple || 2003–2020 || 20 Dec 2020 || 83 || align=left | — || 
|- id="2003 UC191" bgcolor=#E9E9E9
| 2 ||  || MBA-M || 18.6 || data-sort-value="0.57" | 570 m || multiple || 2003–2019 || 28 Jul 2019 || 50 || align=left | Alt.: 2007 TM291 || 
|- id="2003 UE191" bgcolor=#d6d6d6
| 0 ||  || MBA-O || 16.46 || 2.8 km || multiple || 2000–2022 || 26 Jan 2022 || 98 || align=left | Alt.: 2009 WQ138, 2013 NK20 || 
|- id="2003 UF191" bgcolor=#d6d6d6
| 0 ||  || MBA-O || 16.59 || 2.7 km || multiple || 2003–2022 || 25 Jan 2022 || 121 || align=left | — || 
|- id="2003 UM191" bgcolor=#fefefe
| 0 ||  || MBA-I || 17.61 || data-sort-value="0.89" | 890 m || multiple || 2003–2021 || 05 Jan 2021 || 138 || align=left | — || 
|- id="2003 UO192" bgcolor=#E9E9E9
| 0 ||  || MBA-M || 17.7 || 1.2 km || multiple || 2003–2020 || 12 Dec 2020 || 78 || align=left | Disc.: SpacewatchAdded on 24 August 2020 || 
|- id="2003 UP192" bgcolor=#fefefe
| 0 ||  || MBA-I || 18.4 || data-sort-value="0.62" | 620 m || multiple || 2003–2020 || 17 Nov 2020 || 95 || align=left | Alt.: 2016 LH30 || 
|- id="2003 UQ192" bgcolor=#E9E9E9
| 0 ||  || MBA-M || 18.1 || 1.0 km || multiple || 2003–2020 || 17 Sep 2020 || 65 || align=left | Disc.: SpacewatchAdded on 19 October 2020 || 
|- id="2003 UC194" bgcolor=#d6d6d6
| 0 ||  || MBA-O || 15.5 || 4.4 km || multiple || 2000–2021 || 09 Jan 2021 || 158 || align=left | Alt.: 2011 UZ138 || 
|- id="2003 UD198" bgcolor=#E9E9E9
| 0 ||  || MBA-M || 17.1 || 1.6 km || multiple || 2003–2021 || 08 Jan 2021 || 111 || align=left | — || 
|- id="2003 UD199" bgcolor=#d6d6d6
| 0 ||  || MBA-O || 17.07 || 2.1 km || multiple || 2003–2021 || 03 May 2021 || 122 || align=left | Alt.: 2016 GF50 || 
|- id="2003 UF199" bgcolor=#E9E9E9
| 0 ||  || MBA-M || 17.16 || 2.1 km || multiple || 2003–2021 || 09 Dec 2021 || 154 || align=left | — || 
|- id="2003 UC200" bgcolor=#E9E9E9
| 0 ||  || MBA-M || 17.9 || 1.1 km || multiple || 2003–2020 || 17 Nov 2020 || 160 || align=left | — || 
|- id="2003 UP203" bgcolor=#E9E9E9
| 0 ||  || MBA-M || 17.30 || 1.0 km || multiple || 2003–2021 || 07 Apr 2021 || 149 || align=left | Alt.: 2015 PE220 || 
|- id="2003 UR203" bgcolor=#E9E9E9
| 0 ||  || MBA-M || 17.99 || 1.4 km || multiple || 2003–2021 || 01 Dec 2021 || 96 || align=left | Alt.: 2012 TR56 || 
|- id="2003 UM204" bgcolor=#FA8072
| 1 ||  || MCA || 19.3 || data-sort-value="0.41" | 410 m || multiple || 2003–2019 || 28 Aug 2019 || 52 || align=left | Alt.: 2016 WP4 || 
|- id="2003 UK205" bgcolor=#FA8072
| 0 ||  || MCA || 18.18 || data-sort-value="0.69" | 690 m || multiple || 2003–2021 || 03 Dec 2021 || 289 || align=left | Alt.: 2014 WU5 || 
|- id="2003 UC207" bgcolor=#fefefe
| 0 ||  || MBA-I || 17.68 || data-sort-value="0.87" | 870 m || multiple || 2003–2021 || 05 Jun 2021 || 217 || align=left | Alt.: 2007 RF97 || 
|- id="2003 UM207" bgcolor=#FA8072
| 0 ||  || MCA || 17.59 || 1.7 km || multiple || 2003–2022 || 25 Jan 2022 || 67 || align=left | — || 
|- id="2003 UA209" bgcolor=#E9E9E9
| 0 ||  || MBA-M || 19.00 || data-sort-value="0.88" | 880 m || multiple || 2003–2021 || 09 Nov 2021 || 90 || align=left | Alt.: 2012 TE117 || 
|- id="2003 US209" bgcolor=#E9E9E9
| 0 ||  || MBA-M || 18.2 || data-sort-value="0.68" | 680 m || multiple || 2003–2021 || 10 Jan 2021 || 69 || align=left | — || 
|- id="2003 UM210" bgcolor=#fefefe
| 0 ||  || MBA-I || 17.70 || data-sort-value="0.86" | 860 m || multiple || 2003–2021 || 04 May 2021 || 106 || align=left | — || 
|- id="2003 UN210" bgcolor=#fefefe
| 0 ||  || HUN || 18.87 || data-sort-value="0.50" | 500 m || multiple || 2003–2021 || 11 May 2021 || 48 || align=left | Alt.: 2011 UZ116 || 
|- id="2003 UP211" bgcolor=#FA8072
| 1 ||  || MCA || 19.4 || data-sort-value="0.39" | 390 m || multiple || 2003–2019 || 12 Jan 2019 || 38 || align=left | — || 
|- id="2003 UX212" bgcolor=#fefefe
| 0 ||  || MBA-I || 17.96 || data-sort-value="0.76" | 760 m || multiple || 2003–2022 || 26 Jan 2022 || 156 || align=left | — || 
|- id="2003 UE214" bgcolor=#FA8072
| 2 ||  || MCA || 19.5 || data-sort-value="0.37" | 370 m || multiple || 2003–2016 || 05 Jun 2016 || 41 || align=left | Alt.: 2013 TV1 || 
|- id="2003 UG214" bgcolor=#fefefe
| 0 ||  || MBA-I || 18.94 || data-sort-value="0.48" | 480 m || multiple || 2003–2021 || 09 Nov 2021 || 64 || align=left | Disc.: LINEARAdded on 22 July 2020Alt.: 2014 WJ406 || 
|- id="2003 UZ214" bgcolor=#fefefe
| 0 ||  || MBA-I || 18.27 || data-sort-value="0.66" | 660 m || multiple || 2003–2021 || 29 Oct 2021 || 101 || align=left | Alt.: 2014 UE47, 2014 VD34 || 
|- id="2003 UG216" bgcolor=#fefefe
| 0 ||  || MBA-I || 18.1 || data-sort-value="0.71" | 710 m || multiple || 2003–2020 || 15 Sep 2020 || 85 || align=left | Alt.: 2010 VH82 || 
|- id="2003 UA217" bgcolor=#fefefe
| 1 ||  || MBA-I || 18.2 || data-sort-value="0.68" | 680 m || multiple || 2003–2020 || 16 Feb 2020 || 55 || align=left | Alt.: 2019 YY8 || 
|- id="2003 UF220" bgcolor=#E9E9E9
| 0 ||  || MBA-M || 17.5 || data-sort-value="0.94" | 940 m || multiple || 2003–2021 || 04 Jan 2021 || 76 || align=left | Alt.: 2014 HJ60 || 
|- id="2003 UH220" bgcolor=#fefefe
| 0 ||  || MBA-I || 18.39 || data-sort-value="0.62" | 620 m || multiple || 2003–2022 || 07 Jan 2022 || 109 || align=left | Alt.: 2014 YJ17 || 
|- id="2003 UU220" bgcolor=#d6d6d6
| 3 ||  || MBA-O || 17.3 || 1.9 km || multiple || 2003–2021 || 06 Jan 2021 || 50 || align=left | Disc.: SpacewatchAdded on 9 March 2021 || 
|- id="2003 UN224" bgcolor=#fefefe
| 0 ||  || MBA-I || 17.6 || data-sort-value="0.90" | 900 m || multiple || 2003–2020 || 02 Feb 2020 || 104 || align=left | Alt.: 2016 AV71 || 
|- id="2003 UW224" bgcolor=#E9E9E9
| 0 ||  || MBA-M || 17.7 || data-sort-value="0.86" | 860 m || multiple || 2003–2021 || 07 Jan 2021 || 66 || align=left | — || 
|- id="2003 UF225" bgcolor=#fefefe
| 0 ||  || MBA-I || 18.6 || data-sort-value="0.57" | 570 m || multiple || 2003–2021 || 05 Jan 2021 || 108 || align=left | Alt.: 2010 WF67 || 
|- id="2003 UP228" bgcolor=#fefefe
| 0 ||  || MBA-I || 18.5 || data-sort-value="0.59" | 590 m || multiple || 2003–2019 || 01 Nov 2019 || 114 || align=left | — || 
|- id="2003 UA229" bgcolor=#E9E9E9
| 1 ||  || MBA-M || 17.8 || 1.2 km || multiple || 2001–2021 || 06 Jan 2021 || 201 || align=left | — || 
|- id="2003 UM230" bgcolor=#E9E9E9
| 1 ||  || MBA-M || 18.3 || data-sort-value="0.92" | 920 m || multiple || 2003–2021 || 06 Jan 2021 || 72 || align=left | Disc.: SpacewatchAdded on 17 January 2021 || 
|- id="2003 UT231" bgcolor=#d6d6d6
| 0 ||  || MBA-O || 16.2 || 3.2 km || multiple || 2003–2021 || 06 Jan 2021 || 92 || align=left | Alt.: 2017 HD14 || 
|- id="2003 UV231" bgcolor=#fefefe
| 0 ||  || MBA-I || 19.2 || data-sort-value="0.43" | 430 m || multiple || 2003–2020 || 14 Dec 2020 || 59 || align=left | Disc.: LPL/Spacewatch IIAdded on 9 March 2021Alt.: 2020 TN14 || 
|- id="2003 UO232" bgcolor=#fefefe
| 1 ||  || MBA-I || 18.8 || data-sort-value="0.52" | 520 m || multiple || 2003–2019 || 19 Nov 2019 || 70 || align=left | — || 
|- id="2003 US232" bgcolor=#E9E9E9
| 0 ||  || MBA-M || 17.8 || 1.2 km || multiple || 2003–2020 || 16 Nov 2020 || 136 || align=left | Alt.: 2007 RB81 || 
|- id="2003 UN233" bgcolor=#d6d6d6
| 0 ||  || MBA-O || 16.9 || 2.3 km || multiple || 2003–2021 || 05 Jan 2021 || 84 || align=left | Disc.: SpacewatchAdded on 17 January 2021Alt.: 2010 EE171, 2014 QK490 || 
|- id="2003 UU233" bgcolor=#E9E9E9
| 0 ||  || MBA-M || 17.69 || 1.6 km || multiple || 2003–2021 || 05 Nov 2021 || 126 || align=left | — || 
|- id="2003 UM234" bgcolor=#d6d6d6
| 0 ||  || MBA-O || 17.0 || 2.2 km || multiple || 2003–2020 || 14 Dec 2020 || 57 || align=left | Alt.: 2014 WP146 || 
|- id="2003 UQ234" bgcolor=#E9E9E9
| 2 ||  || MBA-M || 18.8 || data-sort-value="0.52" | 520 m || multiple || 2003–2019 || 25 Oct 2019 || 46 || align=left | Alt.: 2007 TN390 || 
|- id="2003 UC235" bgcolor=#d6d6d6
| 0 ||  || MBA-O || 17.3 || 1.9 km || multiple || 2003–2020 || 12 Dec 2020 || 65 || align=left | Alt.: 2014 QY294 || 
|- id="2003 UL235" bgcolor=#fefefe
| 4 ||  || MBA-I || 19.3 || data-sort-value="0.41" | 410 m || multiple || 2003–2017 || 23 Oct 2017 || 37 || align=left | — || 
|- id="2003 UB236" bgcolor=#d6d6d6
| 0 ||  || MBA-O || 16.7 || 2.5 km || multiple || 2003–2021 || 09 Jan 2021 || 142 || align=left | Alt.: 2010 DE84 || 
|- id="2003 UG236" bgcolor=#fefefe
| 0 ||  || MBA-I || 18.4 || data-sort-value="0.62" | 620 m || multiple || 2003–2021 || 16 Jan 2021 || 78 || align=left | Alt.: 2016 SQ22 || 
|- id="2003 UO236" bgcolor=#fefefe
| 0 ||  || MBA-I || 17.4 || data-sort-value="0.98" | 980 m || multiple || 2003–2020 || 14 May 2020 || 256 || align=left | Alt.: 2003 UB143 || 
|- id="2003 US237" bgcolor=#E9E9E9
| 0 ||  || MBA-M || 16.62 || 2.6 km || multiple || 2003–2022 || 04 Jan 2022 || 177 || align=left | Alt.: 2010 MO50 || 
|- id="2003 UT238" bgcolor=#fefefe
| 0 ||  || MBA-I || 18.36 || data-sort-value="0.63" | 630 m || multiple || 2003–2021 || 27 Nov 2021 || 109 || align=left | Alt.: 2014 XJ5 || 
|- id="2003 UX238" bgcolor=#d6d6d6
| 0 ||  || MBA-O || 16.92 || 2.3 km || multiple || 1993–2021 || 15 Apr 2021 || 110 || align=left | — || 
|- id="2003 UD239" bgcolor=#E9E9E9
| 0 ||  || MBA-M || 17.56 || 1.7 km || multiple || 2003–2021 || 08 Sep 2021 || 74 || align=left | — || 
|- id="2003 UW239" bgcolor=#E9E9E9
| 1 ||  || MBA-M || 16.9 || 1.8 km || multiple || 2003–2021 || 09 Jan 2021 || 135 || align=left | Alt.: 2003 UG149 || 
|- id="2003 UR240" bgcolor=#fefefe
| 0 ||  || MBA-I || 18.1 || data-sort-value="0.71" | 710 m || multiple || 2003–2020 || 22 Nov 2020 || 61 || align=left | — || 
|- id="2003 UT242" bgcolor=#d6d6d6
| 0 ||  || MBA-O || 16.3 || 3.1 km || multiple || 2003–2021 || 14 Jan 2021 || 166 || align=left | — || 
|- id="2003 UN244" bgcolor=#E9E9E9
| 2 ||  || MBA-M || 17.2 || 2.0 km || multiple || 2003–2018 || 14 Jan 2018 || 54 || align=left | — || 
|- id="2003 UD245" bgcolor=#fefefe
| 4 ||  || MBA-I || 18.7 || data-sort-value="0.54" | 540 m || multiple || 2003–2019 || 29 Oct 2019 || 38 || align=left | Disc.: SpacewatchAdded on 9 March 2021Alt.: 2019 SD29 || 
|- id="2003 UQ245" bgcolor=#fefefe
| 0 ||  || MBA-I || 18.3 || data-sort-value="0.65" | 650 m || multiple || 2003–2020 || 07 Dec 2020 || 112 || align=left | — || 
|- id="2003 UZ247" bgcolor=#d6d6d6
| 0 ||  || MBA-O || 16.8 || 2.4 km || multiple || 2003–2020 || 21 Jan 2020 || 87 || align=left | Alt.: 2008 RE139 || 
|- id="2003 UE248" bgcolor=#d6d6d6
| 0 ||  || HIL || 16.0 || 3.5 km || multiple || 2003–2020 || 22 Dec 2020 || 90 || align=left | — || 
|- id="2003 UP248" bgcolor=#fefefe
| 0 ||  || MBA-I || 18.65 || data-sort-value="0.55" | 550 m || multiple || 2003–2021 || 30 Dec 2021 || 111 || align=left | — || 
|- id="2003 UH250" bgcolor=#E9E9E9
| 0 ||  || MBA-M || 17.54 || 1.7 km || multiple || 2003–2021 || 30 Oct 2021 || 62 || align=left | — || 
|- id="2003 UF251" bgcolor=#fefefe
| 0 ||  || MBA-I || 19.21 || data-sort-value="0.43" | 430 m || multiple || 2003–2021 || 02 Oct 2021 || 63 || align=left | — || 
|- id="2003 UM251" bgcolor=#E9E9E9
| 0 ||  || MBA-M || 17.3 || 1.5 km || multiple || 2003–2021 || 15 Jan 2021 || 126 || align=left | Alt.: 2011 US133 || 
|- id="2003 UV251" bgcolor=#d6d6d6
| 2 ||  || MBA-O || 17.3 || 1.9 km || multiple || 2003–2019 || 19 Sep 2019 || 26 || align=left | — || 
|- id="2003 UC253" bgcolor=#E9E9E9
| 2 ||  || MBA-M || 18.1 || 1.3 km || multiple || 2003–2017 || 24 Oct 2017 || 40 || align=left | — || 
|- id="2003 UD254" bgcolor=#fefefe
| 0 ||  || MBA-I || 18.66 || data-sort-value="0.55" | 550 m || multiple || 2003–2021 || 03 Aug 2021 || 38 || align=left | — || 
|- id="2003 UO258" bgcolor=#fefefe
| 0 ||  || MBA-I || 18.08 || data-sort-value="0.72" | 720 m || multiple || 2003–2021 || 09 Dec 2021 || 144 || align=left | Alt.: 2010 RS79 || 
|- id="2003 UR261" bgcolor=#E9E9E9
| 0 ||  || MBA-M || 17.58 || 1.7 km || multiple || 2003–2021 || 09 Aug 2021 || 76 || align=left | — || 
|- id="2003 UV262" bgcolor=#d6d6d6
| 0 ||  || MBA-O || 17.1 || 2.1 km || multiple || 2003–2021 || 14 Jan 2021 || 71 || align=left | — || 
|- id="2003 UX262" bgcolor=#d6d6d6
| 0 ||  || MBA-O || 17.4 || 1.8 km || multiple || 2003–2019 || 27 Nov 2019 || 69 || align=left | Alt.: 2014 WU268 || 
|- id="2003 UY262" bgcolor=#fefefe
| 0 ||  || MBA-I || 18.8 || data-sort-value="0.52" | 520 m || multiple || 2003–2019 || 27 Oct 2019 || 98 || align=left | — || 
|- id="2003 UC268" bgcolor=#d6d6d6
| 0 ||  || MBA-O || 17.2 || 2.0 km || multiple || 2003–2019 || 25 Sep 2019 || 78 || align=left | Alt.: 2014 WV224 || 
|- id="2003 UZ268" bgcolor=#fefefe
| 0 ||  || MBA-I || 18.47 || data-sort-value="0.60" | 600 m || multiple || 2003–2021 || 04 Apr 2021 || 40 || align=left | Alt.: 2007 VB118 || 
|- id="2003 UH269" bgcolor=#d6d6d6
| 0 ||  || MBA-O || 16.9 || 2.3 km || multiple || 2003–2020 || 20 Dec 2020 || 202 || align=left | Alt.: 2003 US134 || 
|- id="2003 UY269" bgcolor=#E9E9E9
| 0 ||  || MBA-M || 17.75 || 1.6 km || multiple || 2003–2021 || 04 Oct 2021 || 70 || align=left | — || 
|- id="2003 UL271" bgcolor=#E9E9E9
| 0 ||  || MBA-M || 17.72 || 1.6 km || multiple || 2003–2021 || 24 Nov 2021 || 185 || align=left | Alt.: 2012 TK9 || 
|- id="2003 UO273" bgcolor=#fefefe
| 0 ||  || MBA-I || 18.1 || data-sort-value="0.71" | 710 m || multiple || 2003–2021 || 08 Jan 2021 || 133 || align=left | Alt.: 2010 XC47, 2015 FM222 || 
|- id="2003 UZ274" bgcolor=#fefefe
| 1 ||  || MBA-I || 18.0 || data-sort-value="0.75" | 750 m || multiple || 2003–2018 || 10 Dec 2018 || 77 || align=left | Alt.: 2014 SU311 || 
|- id="2003 UN279" bgcolor=#d6d6d6
| 0 ||  || MBA-O || 16.4 || 2.9 km || multiple || 2003–2021 || 07 Jan 2021 || 113 || align=left | Alt.: 2014 WG104 || 
|- id="2003 UT279" bgcolor=#E9E9E9
| 0 ||  || MBA-M || 17.41 || 1.8 km || multiple || 2003–2021 || 10 Aug 2021 || 141 || align=left | Alt.: 2012 QO7 || 
|- id="2003 UM281" bgcolor=#E9E9E9
| 0 ||  || MBA-M || 17.5 || 1.3 km || multiple || 2003–2021 || 05 Jan 2021 || 185 || align=left | — || 
|- id="2003 UQ281" bgcolor=#d6d6d6
| 0 ||  || MBA-O || 16.5 || 2.8 km || multiple || 2003–2020 || 22 Nov 2020 || 99 || align=left | — || 
|- id="2003 UV281" bgcolor=#d6d6d6
| 0 ||  || MBA-O || 17.72 || 1.6 km || multiple || 2003–2022 || 26 Jan 2022 || 46 || align=left | Disc.: Kitt Peak Obs.Added on 17 January 2021 || 
|- id="2003 UW281" bgcolor=#E9E9E9
| 2 ||  || MBA-M || 17.9 || 1.5 km || multiple || 2003–2021 || 07 Oct 2021 || 66 || align=left | — || 
|- id="2003 UX282" bgcolor=#d6d6d6
| 0 ||  || MBA-O || 16.1 || 3.4 km || multiple || 2003–2021 || 14 Jan 2021 || 218 || align=left | — || 
|- id="2003 UG283" bgcolor=#fefefe
| 0 ||  || MBA-I || 18.4 || data-sort-value="0.62" | 620 m || multiple || 2000–2019 || 19 Sep 2019 || 38 || align=left | — || 
|- id="2003 UY283" bgcolor=#C2E0FF
| – ||  || TNO || 15.3 || 5.0 km || single || 32 days || 19 Nov 2003 || 44 || align=left | LoUTNOs, centaur || 
|- id="2003 UN284" bgcolor=#C2E0FF
| 3 ||  || TNO || 7.5 || 124 km || multiple || 2003–2020 || 14 Nov 2020 || 39 || align=left | LoUTNOs, cubewano (cold), albedo: 0.090; binary: 83 km || 
|- id="2003 UX284" bgcolor=#E9E9E9
| 0 ||  || MBA-M || 18.36 || 1.2 km || multiple || 2003–2021 || 02 Dec 2021 || 49 || align=left | — || 
|- id="2003 UC285" bgcolor=#fefefe
| 1 ||  || MBA-I || 19.1 || data-sort-value="0.45" | 450 m || multiple || 2003–2019 || 19 Sep 2019 || 44 || align=left | — || 
|- id="2003 UJ285" bgcolor=#fefefe
| 2 ||  || MBA-I || 19.7 || data-sort-value="0.34" | 340 m || multiple || 2003–2019 || 29 Sep 2019 || 16 || align=left | Disc.: Kitt Peak Obs.Added on 30 September 2021 || 
|- id="2003 UB286" bgcolor=#d6d6d6
| 1 ||  || MBA-O || 17.6 || 1.7 km || multiple || 2000–2019 || 21 Sep 2019 || 29 || align=left | Disc.: Kitt Peak Obs.Added on 21 August 2021 || 
|- id="2003 UC286" bgcolor=#d6d6d6
| 1 ||  || MBA-O || 17.41 || 1.8 km || multiple || 1998–2021 || 08 May 2021 || 56 || align=left | — || 
|- id="2003 UD286" bgcolor=#d6d6d6
| 3 ||  || MBA-O || 18.2 || 1.3 km || multiple || 2003–2019 || 28 Oct 2019 || 22 || align=left | — || 
|- id="2003 UK286" bgcolor=#d6d6d6
| 0 ||  || MBA-O || 17.9 || 1.5 km || multiple || 2003–2021 || 18 May 2021 || 35 || align=left | Disc.: Kitt Peak Obs.Added on 22 July 2020Alt.: 2018 VQ104 || 
|- id="2003 UO286" bgcolor=#E9E9E9
| 0 ||  || MBA-M || 18.2 || data-sort-value="0.68" | 680 m || multiple || 2003–2019 || 08 Aug 2019 || 32 || align=left | — || 
|- id="2003 UQ286" bgcolor=#E9E9E9
| 0 ||  || MBA-M || 17.6 || 1.3 km || multiple || 2003–2020 || 07 Sep 2020 || 79 || align=left | Alt.: 2014 EJ113, 2015 KA96 || 
|- id="2003 UX286" bgcolor=#d6d6d6
| 0 ||  || MBA-O || 17.23 || 2.0 km || multiple || 2003–2022 || 26 Jan 2022 || 35 || align=left | Disc.: Kitt Peak Obs.Added on 17 January 2021 || 
|- id="2003 UZ286" bgcolor=#d6d6d6
| 3 ||  || MBA-O || 17.5 || 1.8 km || multiple || 2003–2020 || 10 Nov 2020 || 27 || align=left | Disc.: Kitt Peak Obs.Added on 17 January 2021 || 
|- id="2003 UG287" bgcolor=#fefefe
| 1 ||  || MBA-I || 18.7 || data-sort-value="0.54" | 540 m || multiple || 2003–2016 || 21 Oct 2016 || 43 || align=left | — || 
|- id="2003 UL287" bgcolor=#E9E9E9
| 0 ||  || MBA-M || 18.5 || data-sort-value="0.59" | 590 m || multiple || 2003–2021 || 11 Feb 2021 || 51 || align=left | Disc.: Kitt Peak Obs.Added on 11 May 2021Alt.: 2007 RK220 || 
|- id="2003 UX287" bgcolor=#E9E9E9
| 0 ||  || MBA-M || 17.32 || 1.0 km || multiple || 2003–2021 || 13 Apr 2021 || 69 || align=left | Disc.: Kitt Peak Obs.Added on 22 July 2020Alt.: 2017 BJ117 || 
|- id="2003 UH288" bgcolor=#E9E9E9
| – ||  || MBA-M || 17.6 || 1.3 km || single || 5 days || 24 Oct 2003 || 9 || align=left | — || 
|- id="2003 UP288" bgcolor=#E9E9E9
| 0 ||  || MBA-M || 18.09 || 1.3 km || multiple || 2003–2019 || 15 Jan 2019 || 39 || align=left | — || 
|- id="2003 UR288" bgcolor=#fefefe
| 4 ||  || MBA-I || 19.2 || data-sort-value="0.43" | 430 m || single || 70 days || 01 Dec 2003 || 17 || align=left | — || 
|- id="2003 UV288" bgcolor=#fefefe
| 0 ||  || MBA-I || 17.98 || data-sort-value="0.75" | 750 m || multiple || 2003–2021 || 06 Nov 2021 || 95 || align=left | Alt.: 2016 HY7 || 
|- id="2003 UB289" bgcolor=#E9E9E9
| 0 ||  || MBA-M || 18.0 || data-sort-value="0.75" | 750 m || multiple || 2003–2019 || 29 Sep 2019 || 54 || align=left | Alt.: 2010 PJ31 || 
|- id="2003 UF289" bgcolor=#E9E9E9
| 0 ||  || MBA-M || 18.0 || 1.1 km || multiple || 2003–2020 || 17 Nov 2020 || 37 || align=left | Disc.: Kitt Peak Obs.Added on 17 January 2021 || 
|- id="2003 UG289" bgcolor=#d6d6d6
| 0 ||  || MBA-O || 17.1 || 2.1 km || multiple || 2003–2021 || 18 Jan 2021 || 92 || align=left | Alt.: 2011 BC192, 2017 HT24 || 
|- id="2003 UL289" bgcolor=#fefefe
| 0 ||  || MBA-I || 17.9 || data-sort-value="0.78" | 780 m || multiple || 2003–2020 || 31 Jan 2020 || 52 || align=left | — || 
|- id="2003 UM289" bgcolor=#E9E9E9
| 1 ||  || MBA-M || 17.8 || data-sort-value="0.82" | 820 m || multiple || 2003–2018 || 19 May 2018 || 32 || align=left | — || 
|- id="2003 UN289" bgcolor=#d6d6d6
| 0 ||  || MBA-O || 17.2 || 2.0 km || multiple || 2003–2019 || 26 Nov 2019 || 56 || align=left | — || 
|- id="2003 UP289" bgcolor=#d6d6d6
| 0 ||  || MBA-O || 16.7 || 2.5 km || multiple || 2003–2020 || 08 Dec 2020 || 79 || align=left | — || 
|- id="2003 UQ289" bgcolor=#fefefe
| 0 ||  || MBA-I || 19.07 || data-sort-value="0.46" | 460 m || multiple || 1999–2021 || 10 Apr 2021 || 39 || align=left | — || 
|- id="2003 UU289" bgcolor=#fefefe
| 0 ||  || MBA-I || 18.37 || data-sort-value="0.63" | 630 m || multiple || 2003–2021 || 30 Nov 2021 || 78 || align=left | Disc.: Kitt Peak Obs.Added on 5 November 2021 || 
|}
back to top

References 
 

Lists of unnumbered minor planets